= List of Red vs. Blue episodes =

Red vs. Blue, often abbreviated as RvB, is a comic science fiction video web series created by Rooster Teeth Productions and distributed through the Internet and on DVD. The story centers on two opposite teams fighting a civil war in the middle of a desolate box canyon (Blood Gulch) in a parody of first-person shooter (FPS) games, military life, and science fiction films. Initially intended to be a short series of six to eight episodes, the project quickly and unexpectedly achieved significant popularity following its Internet premiere on April 1, 2003.

The fifth season of the original Blood Gulch Chronicles series ended with episode 100, released on June 28, 2007. Three mini-series—Out of Mind, Recovery One, and Relocated —and the three-part Recollection trilogy containing the full-length Reconstruction (2008), Recreation (2009) and Revelation (2010) series (Seasons 6–8) have extended the plot. The Project Freelancer saga began with Season 9 (2011) and follows two separate stories: a continuation to the Recollection trilogy and a prequel set before the events of The Blood Gulch Chronicles. The two stories are continued in two further mini-series—MIA and Where There's a Will, There's a Wall—and concluded in Season 10 (2012).

Burnie Burns confirmed in What's Trending that the series would continue with Season 11, which premiered on June 14, 2013; and Season 11 was later followed by Season 12 and Season 13. In 2016, Season 14 was released as the first anthology season, consisting of several canon and non-canon stories created by in-house writers as well as several outside writers; Freddie Wong of RocketJump, Chris Roberson (creator of iZOMBIE), Ben Singer and Chad James of Death Battle, Ernest Cline (author of Ready Player One and Armada), Arin Hanson and Dan Avidan of Game Grumps, etc. Season 15 debuted in 2017, continuing the canonical story following the events of Season 13. In March, Joe Nicolosi announced Season 16 which focused the events after the last season with a reduced episode count. Nicolosi stepped down after Season 16 concluded, with Jason Weight taking over writing duties and both Josh Ornelas and Austin Clark taking over directing duties for Season 17, which had an even more reduced episode count.

On January 15, 2020, Season 18 was confirmed to be in development with a brief 3-second clip being shown in a promo trailer for upcoming Rooster Teeth releases. The season was done by Death Battle writers Noël Wiggins, Joshua Kazemi, and Ben Singer based on a story by the season's director Torrian Crawford. The series concluded with its 20th season, Restoration, originally released as a film on May 7, 2024.

Episodes were released earlier for subscribers of Rooster Teeth's premium service, originally known as Sponsors and renamed in 2016 as FIRST.

== Series overview ==
Season	Story arc	Episodes	Originally released		Game
Season	Story arc	Episodes	First released	Last released	Game
1	The Blood Gulch Chronicles	19	April 1, 2003	September 28, 2003	Halo
2	The Blood Gulch Chronicles	19	January 3, 2004	June 11, 2004	Halo
3	The Blood Gulch Chronicles	19	October 12, 2004	May 18, 2005	Halo / Halo 2 / Marathon Trilogy
4	The Blood Gulch Chronicles	20	August 29, 2005	April 1, 2006	Halo / Halo 2
5	The Blood Gulch Chronicles	23	October 2, 2006	June 28, 2007	Halo / Halo 2
6 (Note: Also known by its subtitle, Reconstruction)	The Recollection	19	April 5, 2008	October 30, 2008	Halo / Halo 2 / Halo 3
7 (Note: Also known by its subtitle, Recreation)	The Recollection	19	June 15, 2009	October 26, 2009	Halo 2 / Halo 3
8 (Note: Also known by its subtitle, Revelation)	The Recollection	20	April 1, 2010	September 13, 2010	Halo 3 / Halo: Reach
9	The Project Freelancer Saga	20	June 14, 2011	November 14, 2011	Halo / Halo 3 / Halo: Reach
10	The Project Freelancer Saga	22	May 28, 2012	November 5, 2012	Halo / Halo 2 / Halo 3 / Halo: Reach / Halo 4
11	The Chorus Trilogy	19	June 14, 2013	November 11, 2013	Halo / Halo 3 / Halo 4
12	The Chorus Trilogy	19	April 28, 2014	September 29, 2014	Halo 2 / Halo 4
13	The Chorus Trilogy	20	March 31, 2015	September 6, 2015	Halo 2 Anniversary / Halo 3 / Halo 4
14	Anthology	24	May 8, 2016	October 16, 2016	Various (Note: Machinimation mostly in Halo 3, aside from four episodes primarily made with using Halo: Combat Evolved, three with Halo 2, and one with Halo: Reach. Halo 4 is only used for scenes in two episodes. Five episodes have only regular animation. Four are done in live action, half of which also have scenes with machinima.)
15	The Shisno Trilogy	21	April 2, 2017	August 20, 2017	Halo / Halo 2 / Halo 3 / Halo 5
16 (Note: Also known by its subtitle, The Shisno Paradox)	The Shisno Trilogy	15	April 15, 2018	July 22, 2018	Halo 2 / Halo 2 Anniversary / Halo 3 / Halo 5
17 (Note: Also known by its subtitle, Singularity)	The Shisno Trilogy	12	March 9, 2019	May 25, 2019	Halo / Halo 2 / Halo 3 / Halo 4 / Halo 5
18	Zero	8	November 9, 2020	December 28, 2020	Unreal Engine
19 (Note: Also known by its subtitle, Family Shatters)	Zero	11	October 20, 2021	December 29, 2021	Halo 3 / Unreal Engine
20	Restoration	7	May 7, 2024		Halo / Halo 3 / Halo Infinite / Unreal Engine

== Episodes ==
=== The Blood Gulch Chronicles ===
==== Season 1 (2003) ====
In a boxed canyon called Blood Gulch, the boring lives of two opposing teams are about to change with the arrival of a mercenary.

No. overall	No. in season	Title	Original release date
1	1	"Why Are We Here?"	April 1, 2003
Two members of Red Team (Simmons and Grif) ponder why they are stationed in a box canyon, while two Blue soldiers (Tucker and Church) spy on them. Sarge, Red Team's commanding officer, orders Grif and Simmons to meet him at the front of Red Base.
2	2	"Red Gets a Delivery"	April 11, 2003
Sarge and Lopez reveal Red's new light reconnaissance vehicle, the Warthog, and that a new recruit will be arriving soon. Tucker and Church discuss the new vehicle.
3	3	"The Rookies"	April 18, 2003
The new Red recruit, Private Donut arrives. Grif and Simmons haze Donut, sending him on a fool's errand for nonexistent supplies. Blue Team also receives two new additions: Caboose, and a tank.
4	4	"Head Noob in Charge"	April 26, 2003
Church assigns Caboose a bogus mission duty. Donut and Caboose meet; confused as to each other's identity, Caboose gives Donut the Blue Team flag.
5	5	"The Package is in the Open"	May 3, 2003
The Blues discover Donut has their flag and attack him. The Reds see their teammate under attack and hurry to help.
6	6	"1.21 Giga-Whats??"	May 9, 2003
Grif and Simmons ambush Church and Tucker, pinning them behind a rock with the Warthog's chaingun. Caboose decides to use the tank to save his comrades.
7	7	"Check out the Treads on That Tank (Note: Originally released as "Check out the Treads on That Chick".)"	May 23, 2003
The tank's artificial intelligence (AI), Sheila, introduces itself to Caboose and runs him through the tutorial mode. In an attempt to sneak up on the Blues, Grif and Simmons leave the Warthog. The tank drives up behind the Reds, startling Grif and Simmons.
8	8	"Don't Ph34r the Reaper"	May 30, 2003
Grif and Simmons flee from the tank as it attacks the Warthog, and Caboose inadvertently kills Church before he can deactivate the tank's auto-firing mode.
9	9	"After Church"	June 6, 2003
The Reds suddenly receive a radio call from Sarge. Learning of the situation, he flies in with air support that knocks the tank out of commission.
10	10	"A Shadow of His Former Self"	June 20, 2003
Tucker calls Blue Command for reinforcements. Vic, their contact at Command, informs them that they will be sent a "Freelancer" (Mercenary) named Tex. Church's ghost appears in order to warn the Blue Team about Tex, who once slaughtered his entire squad.
11	11	"Knock, knock. Who's there? Pain."	June 27, 2003
Lopez repairs the Warthog, while Grif takes the blame for its destruction. Tex decides to infiltrate the Red base and attack the Reds.
12	12	"Down, but not Out"	July 11, 2003
Tex retrieves the Blue flag, but is surprised and captured by Sarge and Lopez. A wounded Donut is airlifted out of the gulch for treatment.
13	13	"Human Peer Bonding"	July 18, 2003
Church tells Tucker and Caboose that Tex is his ex-girlfriend, and outlines a plan to rescue her.
14	14	"Roomier Than it Looks"	August 1, 2003
Church possesses Sarge's body and uses it to deceive Simmons and free Tex. However, Caboose, wishing to make amends for killing Church, shoots Sarge in the head.
15	15	"How the Other Half Lives"	August 8, 2003
Now both dead, Sarge and Church meet in the spiritual plane. The two complain about their teammates until Grif revives Sarge by using cardiopulmonary resuscitation (CPR).
16	16	"A Slightly Crueler Cruller"	August 15, 2003
A healed Donut returns from Red Command. He brings a speech unit for Lopez, who is revealed to be a robot. Sarge neglects to ground himself, causing damage to the voice card and resulting in Lopez's inability to speak anything other than Spanish, which none of the Reds understand.
17	17	"Points of Origin"	August 29, 2003
Tex repairs Sheila, while Church spies on the Reds, who are still trying to understand what Lopez is saying.
18	18	"SPF 0"	September 12, 2003
Church worries that Tex will soon kill the entire Red Team. If successful, she would then leave before Church could remove the aggressive AI that resides in her armor. To prevent this, Church decides to warn the Red Team of her impending attack.
19	19	"Last One Out, Hit the Lights"	September 26, 2003
Church possesses Lopez in an attempt to warn the Reds, but is stymied by the language barrier. Tex and Sheila attack Red Base. Donut, angry at Tex for wounding him earlier, manages to disable Sheila using a grenade. Church runs to Tex's aid, taking Lopez's body with him. Tex thanks Church for ridding her of the AI before dying. Caboose adopts a deep, menacing voice and says his name is "O'Malley".

==== Season 2 (2004) ====
The misadventures of the Reds and Blues continue with the arrival of a medic and a psychotic A.I.'s quest to rule the universe.

No. overall	No. in season	Title	Original release date
20	1	"Everything Old is New Again"	January 9, 2004
Three months after the events of the previous season, Medical Officer DuFresne ("Doc") arrives in Blood Gulch. Caboose recaps the events of the first season: Tex has died, while Church remains in possession of Lopez's spray-painted body. Caboose occasionally threatens Tucker in a deep, menacing voice. Doc, on loan to both armies due to lacking resources, prepares to visit the Red Team next, but the Reds suddenly attack.
21	2	"Motion to Adjourn"	January 16, 2004
Church and Tucker argue over defensive strategies. The Reds run out of ammunition and consequently try to bluff the Blues into surrendering.
22	3	"Red vs Bleu"	January 23, 2004
The two teams negotiate terms. The Reds demand Lopez's return, but Church does not want to surrender his new body; instead, he offers Doc as a hostage. In return, Grif is forced to publicly humiliate himself.
23	4	"The Joy of Toggling"	February 6, 2004
To repair Sheila, Church and Tucker try to determine how to activate the repair sequence in Church's robot body, activating a homing device at the Red Base.
24	5	"Sweet Ride"	February 20, 2004
Sarge reveals that the Warthog can be driven remotely; Church unwittingly drives the Warthog with vocal commands and corners Sarge with it.
25	6	"Last Words"	February 27, 2004
Tucker disconnects the remote switch, deactivating the Warthog and disabling Church's legs. The Reds decide to return Doc to the Blues.
26	7	"Nobody Likes You"	March 5, 2004
The Blues refuse to accept Doc, fearing that he might be spying for the Reds.
27	8	"Nine Tenths of the Law"	March 19, 2004
Caboose suggests that Church leave his body, so that Lopez can repair himself and Sheila. The freed Lopez promptly flees. Mistaking Lopez for a Blue, Sarge and Simmons prepare to counterattack.
28	9	"In Stereo Where Available"	March 26, 2004
Sarge and Simmons try to run Lopez over with the Warthog. Lopez destroys the Warthog in self-defense and, feeling betrayed, defects to the Blues.
29	10	"Radar Love"	April 9, 2004
Lopez repairs Sheila. The two machines promptly fall in love, much to Caboose's dismay. Tex suddenly appears in Lopez's body.
30	11	"I Dream of Meanie"	April 16, 2004
Tex reveals she has been watching them and noticed Caboose's aggressive behavior. She explains her former AI, O'Malley, had jumped via radio to Caboose when it believed she would not survive. Using Lopez's body as a bargaining chip, she asks Church's help in killing the AI.
31	12	"Room for Rent"	April 23, 2004
Tex explains that everyone in Blood Gulch must turn off their radios so that O'Malley will be unable to jump into someone else's armor when flushed out of Caboose. The ghosts of Church and Tex jump into Caboose's mind to find O'Malley. Tucker and Lopez take Sheila to the Red Base to convince the Reds to turn off their radios.
32	13	"Me, Myself and You"	April 30, 2004
In Caboose's mind, Tex and Church meet Caboose's unflattering mental image of the latter. The Reds panic when they see the Blues approaching.
33	14	"An Audience of Dumb"	May 7, 2004
Tucker accidentally runs over Grif with Sheila. Lopez sings a love song about Sheila to force Red Team to turn off their radios. Church and Tex shoot O'Malley, chasing him out of Caboose's mind.
34	15	"Aftermath, Before Biology"	May 28, 2004
As Doc radios command, O'Malley possesses him. Meanwhile, Tex has disappeared, and Grif awakes from surgery to find that Sarge has replaced most of his organs.
35	16	"What's Mine is Yours"	June 4, 2004
With O'Malley having killed Caboose's mental image of Church, Church unsuccessfully tries to re-establish Caboose's memory of him. At the Red Base, Simmons chides Grif for misusing his rebuilt body. Sarge announces the need to re-acquire Lopez, as his memory contains secret plans from Red Command.
36	17	"Nut. Doonut."	June 11, 2004
Caboose is jealous Lopez and Sheila's relationship. The two robots consider forming their own army due to poor treatment. Donut explores some caves and spots Doc and O'Malley talking to each other. Overhearing O'Malley's evil plans, Donut tries to return to his base, but is captured by the Blues.
37	18	"Dealer Incentive"	June 25, 2004
Church possesses Donut and negotiates with the Reds to have them to build new robot bodies for himself and Tex. Church leaves Donut's body and returns to Blue Base to find that Lopez and Sheila are missing.
38	19	"K.I.T. B.F.F."	July 9, 2004
Sarge unveils two new robots; one contains a microphone to spy on the Blues, and the other contains a bomb. The Reds and the Blues meet to execute the exchange. Sheila and Lopez also arrive to conquer the Blues. A tense Mexican standoff results, and Sarge tries to call an air strike. Tucker accidentally intercepts his message, and realizes that Vic is apparently working for both Red and Blue Commands. Tucker tries to reveal what he has learned but is attacked by Doc/O'Malley. In the ensuing chaos, O'Malley takes Lopez as a hostage, announces his intention to conquer the universe, and disappears through a teleporter. The Reds and Blues call a truce to pursue Doc and Lopez through the teleporter, ending up scattered.

==== Season 3 (2004–05) ====
The Reds and Blues' conflict with O'Malley takes an explosive turn: literally.

No. overall	No. in season	Title	Original release date
39	1	"Best Laid Plans"	October 12, 2004
Donut recaps the previous season. Sarge and Caboose find themselves in the midst of loud-mouthed, perpetually respawning Red and Blue soldiers, who engage in a stereotypical Halo multiplayer match. Meanwhile, Simmons is lost in a place full of teleporters, and Grif and Church have been imprisoned by the Red Team on Sidewinder.
40	2	"Visiting Old Friends"	October 24, 2004
Wyoming, a freelancer, receives a new job. Meanwhile, Sarge and Caboose steal the Red and Blue flags in a failed attempt to coerce the teams to help them find their way out. Simmons retrieves them via a teleporter.
41	3	"Let's Get Together"	November 8, 2004
O'Malley calls Vic and reveals his plot to eliminate Red and Blue Teams and to rule the universe. He has also hired an assassin, Wyoming, to kill Tucker to preserve Vic's secret. Back in Blood Gulch, Tex tells Tucker that Wyoming is from the same program as her. Wanting to help to find Church, Caboose unwittingly activates the bomb in Church's robot body.
42	4	"You're the Bomb, Yo"	November 9, 2004
Simmons reprograms a teleporter and advises Donut on doing the same at Blood Gulch. On Sidewinder, Wyoming kills all of the Reds, leaving Church and Grif. Everyone else emerges from the teleporter on Sidewinder. Wyoming, Tex, and O'Malley fight.
43	5	"Make Your Time"	November 10, 2004
O'Malley activates Lopez's "secret weapon", a weather control device. The Red and Blue Teams confront O'Malley, who wreaks havoc with his rocket launcher. Simmons teleports the Battle Creek troops to Sidewinder and convinces them to defeat O'Malley. Lightning from Lopez's weather device hits Church, damaging the bomb in his body. The bomb explodes and ends up sending both teams (save Church) to the future (Halo 2). The group reasons that they were blown into the future because they were standing in front of Church; Tucker deduces that Church must have been blown into the past, represented by a Marathon 2 map.
44	6	"We Must Rebuild"	November 21, 2004
The Reds and Blues explore a wasteland in the future (Burial Mounds in Halo 2), finding a Warthog along the way. O'Malley discovers Lopez's disembodied head on a beach.
45	7	"New Toys"	December 6, 2004
While Sarge and Donut try to repair the Warthog and the other soldiers argue, O'Malley, Doc, and Lopez find a fortress (Zanzibar in Halo 2) to which they relocate.
46	8	"We're Being Watched"	December 17, 2004
O'Malley, Doc, and Lopez repair the fortress turrets and meet the Red Zealot, who believes that he has found a holy temple. Exploiting The Red Zealot's religious fervor, O'Malley tricks him into performing menial tasks. Sarge, Grif, and Simmons discuss the results of Grif and Simmons' failed reconnaissance, and receive a transmission from Tex with O'Malley's location.
47	9	"It's a Biological Fact"	January 17, 2005
The Reds, Tucker, and Caboose meet with Tex on the beach near O'Malley's fortress, where she reveals her plan to destroy O'Malley and the base by planting a bomb inside. Only Caboose can lift the explosive. The Red Zealot informs O'Malley and Lopez of the group on the beach. Upon learning that Lopez is inside, the Reds balk at destroying the base. Tex agrees to be hired to retrieve Lopez in exchange for a future favor.
48	10	"Heavy Metal"	January 23, 2005
The Blood Gulch group invades O'Malley's fortress and are pinned down by turrets manned by the Red Zealot and Lopez's head. Simmons and Grif enter the base and look for O'Malley. Tucker finds a mysterious sword and uses it to kill the Red Zealot. Caboose hears the voice of Church from a computer.
49	11	"Roaming Charges"	February 14, 2005
In the past, Church finds himself in the housing facility for The Great Weapon, which The Great Destroyer will use to bring Great Doom in the future; Church assumes from the description of the Great Destroyer that it is Caboose. Caboose asks Sarge to look at the computer terminal playing a message from Church. The message tells Caboose not to touch anything, lest he bring about Great Doom. Tucker enters with the sword he found, causing a lockdown, with the bomb counting down. In the past, Church asks the terminal to transport him to Blood Gulch so that he can prevent the whole fiasco. The terminal begins the millennium-long process of researching and building a teleporter.
50	12	"Silver Linings"	March 1, 2005
The computer completes the teleporter and reveals its name to be Gary. Church teleports back to Blood Gulch shortly before the series begins. Another Church runs in and tells Gary to teleport him to Sidewinder instead, because he "screwed everything up." On Blood Gulch Church finds that he either has no effect, or causes the previous events by his presence.
51	13	"Episode 50, Part 2"	March 15, 2005
Future Church continues his attempts to change things for the better, but still ends up causing the disasters he was trying to prevent; he contacts Vic to get the Reds to get rid of Doc, to stop the medic from being infected by O'Malley. Vic misconstrues his words to believe the Red and Blue teams have merged, but that the soldiers must not know, leading to the mix-up that led to Tucker hearing Vic contacting the Reds. Similar attempts to stop Lopez's robot uprising and fix the teleport also fail.
52	14	"Have We Met?"	March 22, 2005
Future Church watches Tex, Donut and Tucker leave for Sidewinder, and follows them after asking Sheila to do him a favor. Once at Sidewinder, he attempts to contact Tex, before another Church approaches him. This new Church claims that he fails to stop the bomb, and gets blown back in time again, only to return to Sidewinder. The bomb goes off, and Future Church is sent back in time. More Churches all meet in Sidewinder, and explain to the newest Church how their various plans failed. It is determined that whichever Church did each one of these plans already must be the successful Church, since he is not sent back in time again. This Church gives up on trying to correct everything and is sent into the future. He arrives in time to stop the bomb from exploding and explains the events he went through.
53	15	"Let's Come To Order"	March 28, 2005
Church warns Tucker that Gary said the sword was dangerous, but Tucker blows it off. Meanwhile, the Reds covertly meet to discuss a distress signal on the Red Army's channel.
54	16	"Hello, My Name Is Andrew"	April 11, 2005
The Blues watch the Reds play with their radio, at a loss for a motive. Caboose explains that they are talking about the distress signal, an explanation he got from "Andy"—the deactivated bomb, who only starts speaking when Gary insults him.
55	17	"Defusing The Situation"	May 2, 2005
Andy talks to the rest of the Blue Team, and is quickly revealed to be rude and volatile. Caboose and the Blues try to calm him down so he won't explode. Meanwhile, the Reds are planning on escaping in the Warthog to find the source of the distress signal. O'Malley assembles a huge army of robot Lopez duplicates outside the base to kill everyone and retrieve the "device".
56	18	"Calm Before The Storm"	May 9, 2005
The Blues calm Andy down, but are interrupted by O'Malley's attack. Believing that the Blues are attacking, Sarge orders the Reds into battle.
57	19	"The Storm"	May 18, 2005
As O'Malley argues with Lopez regarding the slow moving army, Donut steals his hovercraft and goes after the Reds, who fled the battle in the Warthog to track down the distress signal. The source turns out to be from Blood Gulch. O'Malley's army is wiped out, and then O'Malley himself is attacked. Church and Tucker congratulate Tex, but she says she is not responsible. Church questions Gary about the identity of The Great Destroyer, unaware that an alien is sneaking up on him.

==== Season 4 (2005–06) ====
The Reds are back in a familiar setting while the Blues go on a quest with an alien and a sword, all the while O'Malley plans his next move.

No. overall	No. in season	Title	Original release date
58	1	"Familiar Surroundings"	August 29, 2005
Grif despairs over being back in Blood Gulch, despite the others' attempts to shut him up. At Zanzibar, Tex, Tucker, and Caboose discover Church is back in ghost form.
59	2	"Hunting Time"	September 5, 2005
The Red Team takes potshots at Grif with their sniper rifles to get him to stop screaming. The Blues prepare to hunt the Alien that scared Church.
60	3	"Fight or Fright"	September 12, 2005
Simmons tries to convince Sarge that he saw Sheila behind him, but Sarge disregards his testimony. The Blues continue to unsuccessfully try fighting the Alien.
61	4	"Fair Competition"	September 19, 2005
Simmons is frustrated at having fallen out of favor with Sarge, who holds a competition to determine who will be his new right-hand man. The Blues are startled to discover that Caboose has tamed the Alien, thanks to the alien finding him unpalatable.
62	5	"Lost in Triangulation"	September 28, 2005
The Blues fail at understanding the Alien's language. Donut wins Sarge's contest, and Simmons becomes despondent and suicidal. Sheila, who does not remember Simmons was part of the opposite team, tries to cheer him up by leading him back to the reconstructed Blue base.
63	6	"The Hard Stop"	October 5, 2005
The miscommunication between the Blues and the Alien ends when Tucker activates his energy sword, which leads the Alien to jump over and attack him. Tex convinces Andy to help her translate what the alien is saying. Simmons attempts to contact the Red Base, but Donut, under Sarge's orders, refuses communication. Simmons then declares that he will kill all the Reds.
64	7	"Previous Commitments"	October 17, 2005
Andy successfully communicates with the Alien, who reveals that he came to retrieve the energy sword that Tucker found as part of a sacred quest. The sword has locked itself to Tucker as he was the first to find it; as a result, Tucker must join the Alien on its quest. At Blood Gulch, Simmons, having painted himself Blue, plays out his vengeance on the Reds.
65	8	"Looking For Group"	October 24, 2005
The Blues prepare to leave with the Alien. Sarge refuses to accept Simmons back due to his blue armor.
66	9	"Exploring Our Differences"	November 7, 2005
Church and Tex do not come along as the others leave on their quest. Simmons decides to take Grif back to the Blue base as a hostage, though he is not a good kidnapper.
67	10	"Setting A High Bar"	November 22, 2005
Having arrived at the Great Burning Plains (Burial Mounds), the quest team prepares to perform one of the many tasks required of the prophecy. Sarge is annoyed at Donut and ends up considering Grif's rescue.
68	11	"Getting All Misty"	December 5, 2005
Sarge and Donut enter the Blue Base to rescue Grif. Church appears and knocks Sarge out from behind. Church mistakes Simmons as a Blue soldier. The quest team finds itself in a swamp (Backwash), where Andy says they can rest and sleep for a while. Tex joins the team after being promised the sword upon completion of the quest.
69	12	"Talk of the Town"	December 13, 2005
Simmons tries to keep his true identity hidden from Church as they drop off the Reds outside the Red Base. The quest team reaches the edge of the Great Freezing Plains (Containment) that the Alien had mentioned. Tex takes the initiative to clear the nearby temple of guards, and decides to attack under the protection of her cloaking device.
70	13	"Sneaking In"	December 20, 2005
Tex kills the guards, who are actually the soldiers who first appeared at Battle Creek. In Blood Gulch, Donut is finishing his debriefing with Sarge and Grif. Church briefs Simmons on each Red Team soldier.
71	14	"You Keep Using That Word"	January 13, 2006
Church relishes the fact that the Blue Team now possesses all three vehicles within the canyon. He has an argument with Simmons, and makes contact with a descendant of Vic. Andy orders Tucker to open gates of the temple by using his sword as the key. The doors open, revealing an alien ship, to which the Alien rushes towards. After taking off in the ship, the Alien appears to make dive attack on the others, only for Wyoming to gun the ship down. As Tex pursues Wyoming (the events of which are portrayed in the miniseries Red vs. Blue: Out of Mind), Tucker and Caboose leave.
72	15	"Getting Debriefed"	January 23, 2006
Sarge attempts to bury his disgust and hatred toward Grif in an attempt to rally against the Blues. At the Blue Base, Caboose, Tucker and Andy return, and Tucker reports to Church that Tex is pursuing Wyoming and the quest was a failure.
73	16	"Under the Weather"	February 10, 2006
Simmons tries to enter the Red Base to relay vital information about the war to the Reds. However, he meets resistance from Donut and Grif. At the Blue Base, Tucker becomes ill. Andy tells them that if they want a medical diagnosis, they need to find a doctor. Thus, to Church's chagrin, he calls Doc, or rather, O'Malley.
74	17	"Right to Remain Silenced"	March 2, 2006
Simmons enters the Red Base by correctly guessing the weak password established by Grif and Donut, and convinces Sarge not to hold a trial for treason. O'Malley and Lopez reach Blue Base.
75	18	"Things Are Looking Down"	March 16, 2006
Sarge, Simmons, and Grif argue about what the Blues are doing. Sarge gains root access into Lopez to force him to play back the message from Red Command stored in his memory, but it is played back in Spanish. Simmons mentions that the Blues had a bomb that could translate the message.
76	19	"Two for One"	March 20, 2006
While Doc examines Tucker, Sarge, with Lopez's head in tow, heads out to steal Andy from the Blues. Doc gives Church and Caboose his diagnosis; he believes Tucker is pregnant, based on the presence of two different heartbeats.
77	20	"The Arrival"	April 1, 2006
Doc tries to convince the Blues of Tucker's pregnancy. Meanwhile, Andy plays back the message from Command in English for the Reds. After hearing only generic instructions, Sarge becomes depressed, and while Grif tries to cheer him up, Church appears with Sheila, prompting Sarge to call for reinforcements. Caboose calls Church to inform him that O'Malley has moved to another host as the Reds had been using their radios, and that Tucker had his baby. As Church leaves, Donut tries to follow. A ship then promptly lands on top of Donut.

==== Season 5 (2006–07) ====
The Blood Gulch Chronicles ends as the Reds and Blues' conflict with O'Malley reaches its climax.

No. overall	No. in season	Title	Original release date
78	1	"You Can't Park Here"	September 30, 2006
Church returns to Blue Base where Junior, the baby to which a now-comatose Tucker has given birth, is wreaking havoc. Church leaves to investigate the crashed ship, laying claim with Sheila's support.
79	2	"Got Your Back"	October 6, 2006 (sponsors); October 9, 2006 (public)
As Church argues with Simmons and Grif, a tapping noise begins to emit from the ship. Sheila abruptly leaves, forcing Church to retreat. Believing the tapping noise is Donut attempting to communicate, the Reds try to figure out how to lift the ship off him.
80	3	"Baby Steps"	October 13, 2006 (sponsors); October 16, 2006 (public)
Church attempts to call Vic for reinforcements, but is stalled by an elaborate answering machine system. The back door of the ship opens, and an unseen entity emerges.
81	4	"Sibling Arrivalries"	October 27, 2006 (sponsors); October 30, 2006 (public)
Church discovers Vic's voice mailbox is full. The occupant of the ship is revealed to be Grif's sister, who Simmons believes to still be alive in the future due to time dilation. Donut has fallen into a cave after the ship crashed on top of him.
82	5	"The Grif Reaper"	November 3, 2006 (sponsors); November 6, 2006 (public)
As Caboose attempts to spot the new Red using the sniper rifle, Tucker awakens from his coma. Sister explains to the Reds that, following the death of a Team Commander, Command has promoted a soldier to the position and sent her to fill the new low-level opening. Since Command seems to presume him dead, the Reds decide to hold an impromptu funeral for Sarge.
83	6	"In Memoriam"	November 17, 2006 (sponsors); November 20, 2006 (public)
The Red Team holds Sarge's funeral, each giving a separate eulogy. A disgruntled Sarge is buried alive.
84	7	"Strong Male Figure"	November 25, 2006 (sponsors); November 27, 2006 (public)
Tucker is introduced to Junior. Meanwhile, Sister reveals that she was told the dead Commander died of an aspirin overdose. The colorblind Sister was actually sent by the Blues. Underground, Donut finds two suits of Blue armor.
85	8	"Yellow Fever"	December 8, 2006 (sponsors); December 11, 2006 (public)
The Reds argue whether to keep Sister, before Grif secretly decides to rid the team of her before Sarge discovers her Blue allegiance. Doc examines Sheila for her random behavior since abandoning Church. After Grif convinces the Blues to take Sister, Simmons proclaims Sarge missing.
86	9	"Brass Tacks"	December 22, 2006 (sponsors); December 25, 2006 (public)
Church gives Sister an orientation; while they are talking, Tex sneaks up on the Blues. Simmons explains that he discovered a large cavern under Sarge's grave.
87	10	"The Nesting Theory"	January 5, 2007 (sponsors); January 8, 2007 (public)
Grif and Simmons enter the cave. Tex attacks the Blues to try and deduce who is being possessed by O'Malley. Church is killed yet again, but quickly reclaims his body. Church starts to suspect that Sheila is possessed by O'Malley, causing her malfunction.
88	11	"Spelunked"	January 12, 2007 (sponsors); January 15, 2007 (public)
Donut discovers Sarge underground and shows what he has found. As Tex and Sister talk, Church and Tucker discuss having two girls at the base. Simmons and Grif reestablish radio contact with Sarge, and decide to meet.
89	12	"The Haystack"	February 3, 2007 (sponsors); February 5, 2007 (public)
Simmons and Grif are shot with tranquilizers while waiting for Sarge and Donut. The Blues decide to reboot Sheila.
90	13	"Terms and Provisions"	February 17, 2007 (sponsors); February 19, 2007 (public)
Doc gives Sister a physical. Donut and Sarge find Simmons who explains that his attackers have apparently taken Grif with them. Sarge decides to find Grif after realizing his prized shotgun was taken too, tracking him using a device in his armor. The Blues decide Caboose will distract Sheila while Tex shuts her down.
91	14	"Missed Direction"	March 2, 2007 (sponsors); March 05, 2007 (public)
The Reds find Grif, who claims that he was questioned by his captors. As the Blues reboot Sheila, the tank shuts down just before revealing O'Malley's new host to Caboose.
92	15	"Where Credit Is Due"	March 16, 2007 (sponsors); March 19, 2007 (public)
Caboose asks to turn Sheila back on; Tex recommends transferring her to the crashed ship. Grif recounts a conversation he heard while captured; Andy the Bomb, an alien, and a human in blue armor were all having a discussion about a kid and a sword. Grif concludes that they need to find Andy.
93	16	"Biting the Hand"	March 31, 2007 (sponsors); April 2, 2007 (public)
Tex recounts the events of the Out of Mind spinoff series. Church realizes Gary is Wyoming's AI. Church is called by Vic and told to attack the Reds via the caves. The Red team discover a surveillance system watching over Blood Gulch in the cavern.
94	17	"Tucker Knows Best"	April 7, 2007 (sponsors); April 9, 2007 (public)
Church sends Doc, Sister and Junior through the caves while Church, Tex and Tucker attack the Red base head on. Tucker gives some unhelpful life advice to Junior before heading off. Caboose stays at the base to ensure Sheila's transfer is not disrupted. Tucker accidentally shoots Tex.
95	18	"Loading..."	April 21, 2007 (sponsors); April 24, 2007 (public)
The Reds see the Blues advancing on their base on the surveillance system, prompting them to invade the deserted Blue base. Caboose asks Sheila, now uploaded into the ship, where O'Malley is, relaying Tex the answer. Tex then confronts Church, calling him "O'Malley." Doc and Sister head through the caves, where they find Lopez's disembodied head.
96	19	"The Wrong Crowd"	April 27, 2007 (sponsors); April 30, 2007 (public)
Caboose explains that Sheila said O'Malley was inside the "Blue Leader." Church protests that he was never officially promoted to that position, and is not O'Malley's host. In the caves, Doc, Sister and Junior are approached by a new alien and his partner, a revived Captain Flowers, now host to O'Malley.
97	20	"Uncommunicado"	May 12, 2007 (sponsors); May 14, 2007 (public)
The Blues at Red base are ambushed by Wyoming. The tank leaves for the Red base, unmanned. The Reds find Andy in the caves, who explains that the alien revived Captain Flowers, and begins to explain why O'Malley and Wyoming want Junior before the Reds cut him off. The tank is revealed to be controlled by Gary.
98	21	"Same Old, Same Old"	May 26, 2007 (sponsors); May 28, 2007 (public)
Caboose leaves Sheila to help his teammates at Red base. Meanwhile, Tucker finds out that Wyoming has the ability to loop time, having gained it from the AI implantation process, just like Tex's camouflage. By rewinding events until he is victorious in battle, Wyoming is able to detect the invisible Tex before she attacks and kill Caboose. Tucker uses his knowledge of the loop to impale Wyoming with the sword, and save his teammates. When told of the loop, Church wonders if copies of Wyoming were made, when the two come across multiple Wyomings.
99	22	"Repent, The End is Near"	June 9, 2007 (sponsors); June 11, 2007 (public)
Flowers/O'Malley and the alien are revealed to be holding Doc, Sister and Junior hostage at the underground surveillance system; Flowers mentions to Vic Jr. the plan to give Junior the sword in order to grant him unstoppable power, and that the alien is oblivious to their plan. Meanwhile, Church and Tucker manage to escape the Wyomings as the time loops continue, which Tucker states that he is aware of because of his possession of the sword. Gary is disabled after Sheila traps the enemy AI behind a firewall, halting the time loops. After Grif says the Reds would win without glory, the Reds decide to enter the battle in the Warthog, and take out all of the Wyomings but one. O'Malley plans to infect Junior to exploit the entire alien civilization in order to "win the war at any cost." Wyoming says that Tex will aid them now that she knows of the plan, and to Church's disbelief, she announces herself on an open radio channel, taunting O'Malley to "come and get her."
100	23	"Why Were We Here?"	June 28, 2007
Tex claims that ruling the aliens would win the war. Church, however, refuses to believe her, and begins broadcasting on an open channel to prevent O'Malley from jumping into Tex. As Tex kills the last remaining Wyoming, O'Malley accidentally infects Simmons. Tex knocks Simmons out, and follows O'Malley into Caboose's mind. Church approaches the Reds and warns them to disable the ship so that O'Malley can't escape, before entering Caboose as well. Inside Caboose's mind, Church finds Tex and O'Malley negotiating their deal to rule the aliens. Church emerges from Caboose's head to find that Tex has taken the sword, while Junior and the other alien have boarded the ship. O'Malley infects Donut; Tex knocks him out, forcing O'Malley to jump to multiple hosts before jumping back into Tex. O'Malley boards the ship and takes off, but Sarge has placed Andy on board, and gives the order to detonate. The ship disappears, followed soon by an explosion. The episode has six alternate endings; the canonical ending shows the Reds and Blues in mirrored roles referencing the first episode.

=== The Recollection ===
==== Season 6: Reconstruction (2008) ====
A year after the events in Blood Gulch, Agent Washington of Project Freelancer sets out to stop an entity known as "The Meta", who is killing Freelancer agents and stealing their A.I.s. With help from the Reds and Blues, Washington will also uncover dark secrets about Project Freelancer.

No. overall	No. in season	Title	Original release date
101	1	"Chapter 1"	May 26, 2008
Operatives from Project Freelancer launch an investigation at Outpost 17-B after the Red and Blue teams stationed there, except for one Red soldier, are all mysteriously killed. Agent Washington, who had been introduced in the miniseries Recovery One and is revealed as having survived being shot in the back, expresses his thoughts to the Freelancer Counselor that the same entity that attacked him is behind the attacks at Valhalla. The Counselor tells Washington that he suspects that the "Meta" has now acquired the Omega AI (O'Malley). He tasks Washington with getting help from soldiers that have experience fighting Omega at the AI's last known location: Blood Gulch. In the first of a series of memos throughout the episodes, the Chairman of the UNSC Oversight Subcommittee corresponds with the Director of Project Freelancer, discovering the latter's violations of regulation in increasingly hostile missives.
102	2	"Chapter 2"	June 2, 2008
Washington discovers most of the Blood Gulch soldiers have been relocated to undisclosed locations aside from Sister, Sarge, and Lopez. When Washington says he wants information on Omega, Sarge says that he could be helped by Caboose, who was once infected by the AI.
103	3	"Chapter 3"	June 9, 2008
Washington arrives at a Blue base located at Outpost 28, where Caboose has been tied up in the brig due to his unsafe nature. Washington takes Caboose, much to the relief of his team, although not before Caboose accidentally kills another soldier. A Blue soldier watching them transforms into a white-armored soldier, revealing itself to be the Meta.
104	4	"Chapter 4"	June 16, 2008
Washington and Caboose arrive at a small outpost in search of Church, who has been the base's sole inhabitant for over a year. Church is initially reluctant to help until he is told Tex's ship crash-landed at Outpost 17-B. Watching them, the Meta uses the voice of Command to send a fake message to Sarge in Blood Gulch, tricking him into assembling his team to attack Washington and the Blues. The Meta notices movement nearby, which turns out to be Freelancer South and AI Delta, who are also pursuing Washington. Unnoticed, the Meta sneaks up on them.
105	5	"Chapter 5"	June 30, 2008
At Outpost 17-B, Washington, Church, and Caboose sneak to Tex's ship to access its computer. They discover Sheila is still active, despite the ship being badly damaged. Washington and Church activate the flight log, and learn of Tex's struggle to land the ship before it crashed. Washington receives a call from Command, who tell him that a recovery beacon has been activated by the Delta AI and that South is in trouble.
106	6	"Chapter 6"	July 8, 2008
South and Delta are trapped by the Meta in South's collapsing energy shield. South orders Delta to store himself in a portable component, intending to abandon him to buy time for her escape. Washington, Church, and Caboose arrive, and South is wounded by Caboose to prevent her escape. When Church learns that the Meta takes armor enhancements from other Freelancers, he reasons that it may also have Wyoming's time distortion enhancement. The Meta is about to shoot Washington when its armor malfunctions, forcing it to flee. The group decides to find the Meta before it can repair itself. Delta is implanted in Caboose and informs Washington of South's intention to abandon him in order to escape, reminds Washington of her previous betrayal, and reveals that South's brother North suffered a similar fate. Under Delta's advice, Washington executes South.
107	7	"Chapter 7"	July 15, 2008
Church questions Delta about Washington's sanity; Delta tells Church about Epsilon, Washington's old AI that went berserk while in Washington's mind, but reassures Church that Washington is acceptably sane. Church asks why the Meta wants the AIs, so Washington reveals that some equipment cannot be run without them. He also reveals that Delta is only a fragment of a "smart AI"; as Project Freelancer was only given one, Alpha, it was copied to make the rest of the AIs. Washington receives a recovery beacon from Agent Maine, who is suspected to be the Meta, but the transmission is jammed before they receive coordinates. Church guesses it is recharging at the wind-power facility in Zanzibar.
108	8	"Chapter 8"	July 22, 2008
Arriving at Zanzibar, Washington attacks the Meta, who escapes. Church and Washington pursue, while Caboose and Delta head in a different direction to flank the Meta. The Reds arrive in their Warthog and crash. Delta projects itself from Caboose's body; when he does, the many AIs the Meta has captured project themselves too and begin to talk to Delta, all of them saying that they missed him.
109	9	"Chapter 9"	August 4, 2008
In a flashback, Sarge receives the Meta's fake transmission from the end of Chapter 4. It tells him that Washington is re-assembling the Blues, so he makes plans to gather the other Reds, aside from Donut. Sarge leaves for Simmons and Grif's new base, Rat's Nest, where he saves them from execution for selling ammunition to the Blues. Sarge then is incapable of understanding that Grif was promoted to Sergeant.
110	10	"Chapter 10"	August 11, 2008
While under fire by the Reds, Washington checks Caboose's vitals and wonders why he cannot do the same with Church. Washington convinces Sarge to stop attacking as he correctly guesses their codeword (literally codeword), but Grif goes after a nearby Red soldier, who is actually a disguised Meta. The Meta throws a Warthog at Grif, who flees in panic.
111	11	"Chapter 11"	August 18, 2008
The Reds are attacked by the Meta, leading Sarge and Simmons to take shelter with Washington and Church. Washington checks on Caboose, who is unconscious and missing Delta, before using a machine gun to drive away the Meta. Simmons suggests that Church enter Caboose's mind to find out what is incapacitating him. As Simmons distracts Washington, Church enters Caboose's mind. In Caboose's mind, Church meets a prerecorded message left by Delta, which tells him that "memory is the key," and that Washington will understand. Church exits Caboose's mind only to be discovered by Washington.
112	12	"Chapter 12"	August 26, 2008
Stopping the Reds and Blues from bickering, Washington explains that the outposts in Blood Gulch were testing grounds for advanced equipment, and that Freelancers are the only real soldiers. Church delivers Delta's message to Washington, who reveals that they need to go to Command and awaken the Alpha AI, as it contains the information on how the copied AIs were made and their weaknesses.
113	13	"Chapter 13"	September 8, 2008
Washington and the Reds and Blues head back to Valhalla. The Reds try to capture a Warthog but they end up destroying it. A Hornet then appears and chases after the Reds and Washington. Church ignores Washington's previous orders and leaves Caboose and his body in the middle of the canyon to look at Tex's body, possessing a guard to do so.
114	14	"Chapter 14"	September 15, 2008
Washington finds Church and berates him for slowing his mission down. Washington is able to take down the Hornet and meets with the Reds and Blues at Blue Base. While the group discuss how to infiltrate Command, Caboose suggests they disguise themselves as UNSC soldiers and use a tank to get there. The group goes with Caboose's plan and are able to infiltrate Command's base, unaware that the Meta has followed them in.
115	15	"Chapter 15"	September 23, 2008
With Church pretending to be a prisoner, Washington breaks into the AI storage facility to search for the Alpha while the Reds and Caboose remain in the upper base. Washington tells Church that he has found what they were searching for: the remains of his old AI, Epsilon.
116	16	"Chapter 16"	September 29, 2008
As boredom sets in for the Reds, Sarge and Simmons suspect that since they are inside Command, they can access all data relating to the Red and Blue soldiers, leading Sarge to come up with the idea to "erase the Blues." In the AI vault, Washington explains everything to Church: during the Great War the human race was in danger of losing, and Project Freelancer was one of many projects created to win the conflict. The Director subjected the Alpha AI to stressful scenarios, causing it to fragment, and each fragment, representing a personality trait, was turned into the different AIs given to the Freelancers. Alpha was unable to keep its memories intact, which is what led to Epsilon's creation, representing Alpha's memories. After being implanted with it, Washington knew what was done to Alpha through flashes from Epsilon, but never told his superiors. When Church questions how this will help them stop the Meta or find the Alpha, Washington states that after the break-in the Alpha was moved to a remote location. He recalls how Church was stuck at Blood Gulch, how all the members of the outpost Church was previously stationed at were moved, how he always agreed with Delta, how he didn't feel any different when Omega infected him, and how he was able to jump from suit to suit like Omega. Washington tells Church that he's not a ghost, but rather the Alpha.
117	17	"Chapter 17"	October 13, 2008
As Sarge has Simmons delete the Blues from Command's database, Grif receives an incoming distress call from Tucker, who claims to have found something "under the sand". Church has trouble accepting that he is the Alpha, while Washington tells Church that he needs him to defeat the Meta. Church suggests that he get help from Tex since she is like him, but Washington is unwilling to trust her. Washington and Church leave the AI vault with Epsilon. Caboose notices several soldiers approaching them from outside, leading Grif to close the shutter to keep them out.
118	18	"Chapter 18"	October 21, 2008
Washington and Church outrun the guards and regroup with the Reds and Caboose, but Recovery agents have them pinned in the bunker. Church decides to use it to check if he really is an AI, but is dismayed when Simmons points out the information has been deleted. Outside, the Meta attacks the Recovery agents. Washington, having planned on the Meta's appearance, uses it as a distraction to get to the motor pool. There, he attempts to send the Reds and Caboose away with Epsilon so it can be returned to the authorities, while he and Church remain behind to activate an EMP failsafe to eliminate the remaining AIs and equipment in the vicinity, knowing the Meta would endeavor to recover all the AIs in the vault. Church intends to leave instead, as he is apathetic to Project Freelancer and its exploits. Washington gives him a choice to leave or stay and find out the truth.
119	19	"Chapter 19"	October 30, 2008
The Reds and Blues attempt to flee the base in their vehicles while Washington attempts to finish Project Freelancer by activating the EMP. The Meta follows him inside the facility as he predicted. Washington heads towards the terminal allowing him access to the failsafe and suddenly the Counselor and Director speak and attempt to stop him. The Meta arrives, being revealed as Freelancer Agent Maine, who is attempting to gain the trust of Project Freelancer so he can meet the Alpha AI, a promise made by the Director, and shoots Washington. Washington, answering Maine's question of where the Alpha is, reveals Church, who jumps inside the Meta's head, maintaining that the EMP will not kill him because he believes he is a ghost. Washington activates the EMP. The Reds' Warthog is disabled by the pulse, but Caboose manages to save Epsilon from the EMP wave by driving his vehicle off a cliff. In the epilogue, the Reds have moved to Valhalla, with Caboose trying to bring Epsilon back online. The Director steps down from his position after the Chairman presses criminal charges against him and Project Freelancer and hands out a final memo. The Director reveals in his final memo that he loved a woman early in his life that was killed many years ago, something that has haunted him. He tells the Chairman to send his men, stating that he will not fight back. The signoff reveals that Alpha/Church was based on the mind of the Director himself, Doctor Leonard Church.

==== Season 7: Recreation (2009) ====
Caboose sets out on a quest in an attempt to bring back Church.

No. Overall	No. in Season	Title	Original release date
120	1	"Don't Get Me Started"	June 16, 2009
Grif tries to stall Sarge from an attempt at intimidating the Blues—which consist only of Caboose—because he wants to fight only one incompetent enemy instead of a whole squad of genuine soldiers. Command brushes Sarge off as the Reds had deleted the information on the Blues while at Command.
121	2	"Free Refills"	June 23, 2009
The Reds decide that in order to fight Blue Team, they need to restore the deleted information on them. Sarge tells Simmons to wake up Donut, but they find him missing. He turns out to be at Blue Base, seeing Caboose recounting previous adventures to Epsilon.
122	3	"Visiting Hours"	June 30, 2009
Donut confronts Caboose and tells him that he has an important message for Church from Tucker, being able to only say that Tucker needs help. Then the Reds arrive in search of Donut.
123	4	"Catching Up"	July 6, 2009
Donut tells Caboose about what happened to him after he was relocated from Blood Gulch, including his debriefing by the Counselor and how after arriving at his new base, he found a distress signal from Tucker telling him to find Church. Caboose, after explaining the events of Reconstruction to Donut, calls Washington, who is revealed to be incarcerated. Washington is surprised to hear that Caboose and the Red Team received new bases while he was arrested and that Caboose still has Epsilon. He tells the guard he needs to talk to the prison commander.
124	5	"Local Host"	July 13, 2009
After Washington hangs up on Caboose, Donut offers to help him with his project and mentions that the Red team's underground holo-room could be useful before returning to Red base. Caboose decides to take Donut's advice and sneaks off toward Red base with Epsilon. Donut explains his brief visit to the Reds. Only Grif notices Caboose's entering Red base, but he ignores him. Once inside, Epsilon begins to make humming sounds, which alarms Caboose.
125	6	"One New Message"	July 27, 2009
Epsilon's storage unit suddenly opens up, and Delta appears. Delta asks Caboose for his help on a mission; specifically, to be taken to the source of energy that Donut had previously mentioned, and also where Tucker is supposed to be, so they can punish those who harmed Alpha. As Delta disappears, the Reds arrive and Caboose tells them that he is leaving to get Tucker. Grif volunteers to go with him so that he can ensure Command acknowledges the Blues exist. Sarge decides to go as well, but Simmons chooses to stay behind with Donut.
126	7	"Bon Voyage"	August 3, 2009
The team of Caboose, Sarge, and Grif leaves on a Warthog. After they leave, Simmons informs Donut and Lopez that he is going to blow up Blue Base. Meanwhile, the other team arrives in the desert, only to be told they have driven into a mine field.
127	8	"Directions"	August 10, 2009
Back at Blue Base, Simmons discusses the mess Caboose has made in his project to build a new body, and offhandedly offends Lopez; Lopez in turn deliberately stonewalls Simmons' request for explosives. Meanwhile, a voice over the intercom tells Grif, Caboose, and Sarge to remain still so they can work out a way to navigate out of the mine field. After they prove incapable of following simple directions, a frustrated Grif decides to just drive his way out, triggering many explosions.
128	9	"My House, From Here"	August 17, 2009
Grif crashes the jeep into the vehicle driven by the person who was trying to guide them out. The guide explains that the area is a restricted dig site, and is soon joined by a friendly alien, "Smith", revealing to the surprised soldiers that they are working together. Elsewhere, Washington is led by a prison guard to a door, and is told he has five minutes to talk with the "man in charge". The door is opened, and the voice of the Chairman is heard off-screen, telling Washington they have much to discuss.
129	10	"Lay of the Land"	August 24, 2009
Donut comes back from investigating Blue Base for parts, mentioning off-hand that Caboose took Epsilon with him. Simmons becomes upset, as returning Epsilon to the authorities was part of the deal that got the teams their new bases, and attempts to radio Sarge to let him know. Unfortunately, he is unable to make contact as Sarge's radio isn't working. Back in the desert, the guide explains the treaty between humans and aliens and that another dig team may cause an incident. The guide does permit Sarge, Grif and Caboose to scavenge for parts to fix the jeep and supplies as long as they don't wander off. As Sarge notes that something seems off, the guide tells Smith to return to getting the temple to open while he takes care of the others, as the camera reveals the dead bodies of the real investigation team.
130	11	"Dumb Cop, Bad Cop"	August 31, 2009
Sarge and Grif scavenge for a radio, but learn that all of them either don't work or have been removed from the vehicles. At Valhalla, Lopez builds two motorcycles for Simmons and Donut so that they can meet up with Sarge and the others. Simmons notices that Donut is missing and goes to find him, destroying one of the motorcycles in the process. Back in the desert, the guide introduces himself as C.T. and asks for Caboose's whereabouts. An alarm sounds in the distance; Grif says that it is most likely Caboose, and C.T. orders them up the hill.
131	12	"Well Hello"	September 7, 2009
Donut is cleaning up Blue Base when the Meta appears. Donut remains oblivious to the danger, believing the Meta to be a new Blue soldier. Simmons recognizes the Meta and flees. Several of C.T.'s men surround Caboose at gunpoint, accusing him of sabotaging the vehicles. Caboose merely replies that he was looking for a home for Epsilon. Suddenly the temple door is opened; a firefight breaks out between C.T.'s men and an unknown enemy. Tucker emerges from the temple, wielding his energy sword and calling for the Reds and Blues to enter the temple.
132	13	"Called Up"	September 14, 2009
Washington and the Chairman hold their meeting, and Washington reveals he knows that the Blue Team has Epsilon, as due to their deletion from Command's records they were not searched. The Chairman agrees to drop all charges against Washington and let him have access to leftover Freelance equipment in exchange for returning Epsilon back to the UNSC. Tucker is disappointed in the fact that his rescue party consists of two Reds and Caboose. It turns out that the temple houses an artifact, built by an ancient civilization, which happens to be a huge weapon. He explains that C.T. and the others killed the dig site team and were trying to steal the weapon to sell it to the highest bidder. He tells them that they must either destroy the weapon or kill C.T. and his men.
133	14	"The Installation"	September 21, 2009
As C.T.'s team attempts to breach the ruins, Caboose wanders off, forcing the others to go look for him. Tucker, Grif and Sarge happen upon Caboose, who has found a floating robot (a Halo Monitor) that has Church's voice, though he seems to have no memory of the other soldiers. Back at Valhalla, Simmons and Lopez attempt to attack the Meta, resulting only in Simmons destroying the motorcycle again while Lopez drives the Meta away with missiles.
134	15	"Watch The Flank"	September 28, 2009
Simmons and Lopez fortify the Red Base in preparation for the Meta's next attack. Caboose explains that he found a new body for Epsilon, who inherited Church's voice and personality. However, Epsilon Church's memories are still incomplete, and the only knowledge he possesses about the Red and Blue Teams are based completely on the stories Caboose told him. After becoming acquainted with them, Epsilon declares himself the leader and plans to stop C.T. and the others from getting the weapon.
135	16	"Retention Deficit"	October 5, 2009
As the Valhalla group assesses their situation, Donut mistakenly translates one of Lopez's comments on the vehicles as a possibility for escape by hijacking the Meta's transport. At the temple, Epsilon Church attempts to access his memories and functions as Caboose warns Tucker about the repressed torture memories within him. In the end, Epsilon Church only manages to deactivate his short term memory as C.T.'s men enter the temple.
136	17	"Trust Issues"	October 12, 2009
The Reds at Valhalla make a break for Blue Base in an attempt to escape The Meta. Sarge expresses his concerns that Blue Team now outnumber the Reds with their "three members". Grif assures Sarge that they don't have any advantage, and that Epsilon Church hardly counts as a soldier. Caboose fixes Church's short term memory problem by hitting him. Alien soldiers appear and the Reds engage them in battle. Epsilon Church discovers he has telekinetic powers, but then loses control of his body, floating out of the room.
137	18	"Hang Time"	October 19, 2009
The Reds at Valhalla locate the Meta's cloaked jeep and prepare to make off with it. At the temple, one alien that suddenly stops firing when it sees Epsilon Church, to whom it bows. After Tucker reveals that many aliens worship the old artifacts, Epsilon Church flings a box into the alien. C.T.'s group arrives and one of his soldiers disables Epsilon-Church, prompting the aliens to retaliate. C.T. flees with Epsilon Church and Grif, Sarge, and Caboose give chase in the Warthog.
138	19	"Think You Know Someone"	October 26, 2009
After destroying C.T.'s vehicle, Tucker is cornered. As C.T. prepares to kill Tucker, Epsilon Church appears and kills C.T. with the relic's laser weapon. Tucker, Church, Caboose, Sarge, and Grif gather on top of the temple where a swarm of aliens are seen on the ground. At Valhalla, Washington appears just before the Meta attacks Simmons' group, revealing that they are working together. An angry Wash shoots Lopez and Donut and demands Simmons give him the Epsilon AI.

==== Season 8: Revelation (2010) ====
The Reds and Blues prepare for a final showdown with former Project Freelancer agents Washington and Maine. Epsilon Church sets out to find the truth about Project Freelancer, the Director and the late Agent Texas.

No. Overall	No. in Season	Title	Original release date
139	1	"For Those of You Just Joining Us..."	April 1, 2010
Doc arrives in Valhalla after receiving a distress signal. He is reunited with Simmons where he discovers that Donut, who was shot last season, is now dead, and is then held at gunpoint by Washington and Meta. At the desert, Grif has been burying the dead soldiers they killed while Epsilon Church is worshiped by the Aliens. Church sees a mysterious black figure off in the distance and follows, with Tucker, Sarge, and Grif not far behind while Caboose tries to entertain the restless aliens. Epsilon reveals that he had a vision of Valhalla.
140	2	"Drink Your Ovaltine"	April 12, 2010
Washington orders Doc to give the Meta a medical evaluation. Back in the desert, Sarge uses Epsilon Church to boost the Warthog's radio and contacts Simmons, who is forced by Washington to claim that everything is fine. Sarge senses something is wrong and deduces the situation at Valhalla. As he and Grif set off to rescue them, an intrigued Epsilon Church follows.
141	3	"Upon Further Review"	April 19, 2010
Tucker searches for the Reds and Epsilon Church, and guesses they must have taken off. Caboose warns Tucker not to say anything about Epsilon Church's absence, as the aliens would become hostile if they knew he was gone. Sarge arrives at Valhalla; Washington moves out to intercept him. Simmons and Doc plan to short circuit the Meta's armor using an overpowered charge on Doc's medical scanner. Washington confronts Sarge and disarms him but Grif hits Washington with the Warthog and the freelancer is engulfed in an explosion.
142	4	"Recovering One"	April 26, 2010
Doc hits the Meta with a blast from his overloaded scanner, knocking him back and also causing the Meta's temporal distortion unit to malfunction and slow him temporarily. Simmons joins Sarge and Grif on the warthog, but their ride is destroyed by the Meta. As the Reds prepare to fight, Epsilon Church arrives and catches the interest of the Meta. The Reds take the opportunity to flee through a hole in the valley wall, which leads to another canyon; Epsilon Church seals the breach before running out of power. He mentions that they "can't let them get to her first" before passing out. The Reds retreat while Washington assures the Meta that they still have a lead. Doc, still stuck in the wall, calls out for help.
143	5	"4th and Twenty"	May 10, 2010
The Reds return to the desert to find Caboose being threatened by the aliens as a result of Epsilon Church going missing. To get the aliens off his back, Caboose claims that the Reds took him. Grif, knowing that the aliens would attack if they found them in possession of Epsilon Church, punts him out of sight. When Tucker and Caboose arrive, the Reds flee and Caboose abandons Tucker, leaving him to face the aliens alone. The Reds and Caboose locate Epsilon Church in the minefield.
144	6	"Towing Package"	May 17, 2010
Washington and the Meta try to free Doc from the wall. The Delta fragment of Epsilon's memories activates and warns Caboose that due to the encounter with Washington, Epsilon has begun searching his memories, and that some of them must remain hidden in order to prevent his insanity from reemerging. Epsilon Church then regains control and asks Caboose to help him with a task at a facility.
145	7	"And Don't Call Me Shirley"	May 24, 2010
Washington interrogates Doc. At the desert, the Reds spy on Epsilon Church and Caboose. Sarge believes that the Reds may be able to restore the Blues to command's database at the facility mentioned by Epsilon Church, and leaves in pursuit. Tucker flees the aliens. Epsilon Church and Caboose arrive at the entrance to the facility. The facility's security program, F.I.L.S.S., misidentifies Church as the director and opens the door.
146	8	"Pursuing The Archive"	May 31, 2010
Epsilon and Caboose enter what turns out to be to be a Freelancer storage facility. Outside, the Reds make plans to gain entry by posing as Freelancer agents. In the desert, Washington tracks a recovery beacon, which turns out to be the buried C.T., whom Washington reveals was a female Freelancer agent. As he orders the Meta to scavenge her equipment, the Aliens confront them.
147	9	"Backup Plans"	June 7, 2010
Washington decides to kill the aliens and leave one alive to talk, resulting in the Meta leading an attack. Back at the Freelancer facility, the Reds gain entry and find a frightened Caboose outside a door with Epsilon Church shouting at an unknown individual on the other side. Something begins breaking the door down. The Reds prepare to ambush whatever it is, only for Tex to appear on the other side.
148	10	"This One Goes To Eleven"	June 21, 2010
Tex attacks the Reds and Tucker. After defeating everyone, she walks away before being held at gunpoint by Church, now in a new body.
149	11	"Restraining Orders"	June 28, 2010
Caboose asks F.I.L.S.S. for help; she suggests the armor lockdown safety protocol. This immobilizes Tex, but also affects everyone else, except Caboose because his outdated helmet does not have the lockdown protocol. In the desert, Washington and the Meta have apparently killed all the aliens, which has foiled their plan to interrogate a survivor. Wash orders Doc to check the aliens' pulses, while the Meta goes off to check for clues in a nearby cave.
150	12	"Snooze Button"	July 12, 2010
Church wakes up in Recovery mode, and his attempts to communicate with Tex are refused. Church has his and Tucker's armor unlocked, but decides to keep Tex locked up until he can figure out what to do with her. The Reds also remain in lock down, believing they are dead and in some kind of Purgatory. Church lets them out if they agree not to fire on the Blues or Tex, something they reluctantly agree. The Meta discovers the Epsilon storage unit that Caboose and Church left behind.
151	13	"Battle of the Exes"	July 19, 2010
The Meta begins converting the storage unit into a capture unit to retake Epsilon. The Reds and Blues debate reactivating Tex until Church takes AI form and inserts himself into her body. Once there, the two bicker for a bit until Church agrees to let her out. In the sponsors-only ending, the disabling of recovery mode also revives Donut back in Valhalla.
152	14	"Reconfiguration"	July 26, 2010
The Meta finishes configuring the old Epsilon unit into a capture unit and Doc suggests a way of tracking the others. Tex fully recovers and discusses Epsilon Church's motives on freeing her. Meanwhile, the Reds decide to use the absence of the Blues to put them back into the database.
153	15	"Check Your Local Listings"	August 2, 2010
Simmons and Tex begin working together to sort through personnel files, only to be roadblocked by the director's files being restricted and no record for either Tex or Church. However, Tex does pull up another Freelancer base not far from their location. As she sets off to check out the weaponry, F.I.L.S.S. asks Church to make a journal update as the Director used to. Church has the entries transferred to him and deleted from the database, an act observed by Sarge before sending Grif to aid Simmons with supplies. After acquiring some new armor, Tex and Church set off for the other outpost.
154	16	"Standardized Testing"	August 16, 2010
After dispatching the guards by herself, Tex and Epsilon Church arrive at the Freelancer base. Church has another flash of Valhalla and realizes he mixed the two locations up in his memories. Tex reveals that this was where Alpha was sent after the very first break-in, of which she was a part, and also the location where Omega and Gamma tortured the Alpha to fragment him, breaking him to the point he could not recognize anyone.
155	17	"Tenth Percentile"	August 23, 2010
Informed by F.I.L.S.S. that the storage facility contains backups of Project Freelancer data, Simmons has her restore the Blue Army data. The records reveal that all of the Red and Blue bases are merely training grounds for Freelancer agents, and are staffed with the army's worst soldiers based on poor test scores and poor field performance. Furthermore, all of the strange events the Reds and Blues had encountered during The Blood Gulch Chronicles were part of several scenarios that may be run at simulation bases. Sarge is shocked by these revelations. At the Freelancer base, Tex reveals she is looking for the Director, and suggests that Washington and the Meta may know who he is. If not, she will simply kill them, and if she cannot find the Director, she will settle for destroying everything he built. She shoots Church, triggering his recovery beacon, which Washington and the Meta pick up.
156	18	"Rally Cap"	August 30, 2010
Washington, Doc, and the Meta arrive to find Church lying in the snow unguarded. Washington guesses it is a trap, and a series of mines under their Warthog explodes. Caboose informs the others of Church's beacon and tries to get them to help; they are reluctant to aid him. Sarge volunteers to go by himself. When asked why, Sarge gives a rousing speech to the others, referencing the very first episode, asking them all why they're all here and deciding to be more than just cannon fodder for the Freelancers. The others decide to assist.
157	19	"Reunion"	September 6, 2010
Washington is interrogated by Tex about the director's location, but she is then attacked by the Meta and captured using the storage unit. Washington asks the Meta for the memory unit, but the Meta attaches it to his own armor, allowing him to cloak. The Reds and Blues suddenly arrive in ship, which they crash. The Reds and Blues regroup with Church and Wash, and then discuss how to free Tex from the memory unit, which is lying in the snow nearby. Washington gives orders, sending Tucker and Caboose to look for tools and Red Team to look for a power source for the memory unit. As the others leave, Church reveals what he learned from the Director's journals about Tex: she was a by-product of the creation of Alpha, a memory of the Director's lost love, Allison. Because all the Director could remember of Allison was her death, Tex is forever doomed to fail just when victory is within her grasp. Church volunteers to save Tex, but Washington refuses, due to the fact that bringing back Church is the only thing that can clear his name and get him out of prison. Suddenly, the Memory Unit rises off the ground, still attached to the cloaked Meta.
158	20	"N+1"	September 13, 2010; September 11, 2010 (Sponsors)
Washington's attacks against the Meta are ineffectual. The other teams push the Meta off a cliff to his death. With the capture unit close to shutting down, Epsilon prepares to enter it to find Tex. The unit fails before Church and Tex can emerge. Later, UNSC recovery forces arrive to investigate, and the Red and Blue teams are questioned before being allowed to return to their training bases. During the interrogation, it is revealed Washington has faked his death and is now wearing Church's armor. The capture unit is tossed. Narrating the epilogue, Epsilon says that he did not find Tex right away. However, he has learned from the Director's mistakes. Instead of trying desperately to find Tex, and pushing her away in the process, he'll stay in a place where she could find him and be patient. He decides to wait in his memories of Blood Gulch. The canyon is a bit different from how he remembered it (as the series now shifts to Halo: Reach), and he hopes that things can be different for him too.

=== The Project Freelancer Saga ===
==== Season 9 (2011) ====
In the memory capture unit, Epsilon Church hopes to find Tex in the memories of Blood Gulch. The season features flashbacks of Project Freelancer's prime during their conflict against a rogue UNSC faction.

No. Overall	No. in Season	Title	Original release date
159	1	"Rounding Error"	June 14, 2011
Within the Epsilon Unit, Epsilon Church's internal monologue is repeatedly interrupted by Tucker, who keeps calling him up to the cliff. There Caboose and Tucker are waiting to spy on the Reds, who are making modifications to their jeep. As the Blues argue about what the modifications are the Reds fire a rocket from the Warthog at them, where Church hears Donut giving orders. Church becomes frustrated about how events are not occurring correctly. In a flashback to years earlier, the Director of Project Freelancer and the Counselor stand in front of a leaderboard and argue about an upcoming mission.
160	2	"The Twins"	June 20, 2011
The Director sends twin agents North & South Dakota into a research facility to steal data files, but guards sound the alarm. When the agents reach the landing pad for extraction, they find themselves surrounded.
161	3	"Number One"	June 27, 2011
An unnamed agent in blue armor arrives to help South and North. North is wounded while protecting South from enemy fire. The unnamed agent helps the twins to escape. In the Epsilon unit, the Reds formulate a plan to attack the Blues until Church shows up. They do not recognize him, but agree to hear him out.
162	4	"Evacuation Plan"	July 4, 2011
Attempting to set things straight, Church tries to convince the Reds that their personalities are wrong. During the Freelancer mission, the mysterious agent is revealed to be Carolina and the dropship comes under attack from enemy fighters. The dropship manages to reach the rendezvous point.
163	5	"Realignment"	July 18, 2011
Church makes his way back to Blue Base where Caboose heads in the base and calls Command, who has sent out a special forces member to the Blues. As Simmons requests Donut to help with the construction of Lopez, Grif and Donut begin to revert to the personalities of their real selves, causing an earthquake. On the Freelancer ship, the Director reveals the mission has provided new information on a Freelance target and updates the Freelance agent rankings. South is upset at losing a spot, but the Director scolds her for failing the mission's objective of remaining discreet and making their next mission harder.
164	6	"Familiar Feelings"	July 25, 2011
As Church struggles to get Caboose to remember when the new agent will arrive, Sarge and Simmons continue to work on Lopez. Church attempts to activate Sheila in case things get dicey when Tex shows up. His attempts get Tucker to start reverting to his real personality. Donut's extended conversation on feelings ends up draining Sarge of his desire to do so, turning him back into his regular gruff self.
165	7	"Case File 01.045"	August 1, 2011
Washington and Connecticut return from a failed mission. Though Washington tries to cheer up "Connie", she says that the Director is trying to incite rivalries between the Freelancers through the ranking system. As Connie leaves, she asks Washington to call her "C.T." To prepare for Tex's arrival, Tucker sets up a training session to teach Church and Caboose on how to interact with girls.
166	8	"Shaking The Foundation"	August 8, 2011
At Red Base, Simmons begins to show signs of his real personality as Lopez is finished. Lopez activates and speaks Spanish. Sarge explains this is adding culture and learning the language as a unit bonding activity, and as he and Simmons acknowledge how out-of-character that is, another earthquake hits. Church explains to Tucker and Caboose that the earthquakes are caused by the failing capture unit and the point of this is for him to try and figure out about himself.
167	9	"Captive Audience"	August 15, 2011
Lopez notices that the earthquakes are getting more frequent, and tries to warn the Red Team that they are in danger, but is not understood. Simmons, jealous at the attention Lopez is receiving from the Reds, storms off to prove to Red Team that he can be charismatic. Church explains they are experiencing a form a recursion within the Epsilon unit, where the computer tries many different iterations of the same scenario to find a solution. They are interrupted by a thrown grenade. A conversation between Washington and North is interrupted when a group of guards run past saying that a new recruit is facing off against Maine, Wyoming, and York in a three-versus-one sparring match.
168	10	"Introductions"	August 29, 2011
During the sparring match, Tex easily defeats her three opponents; in a new round, the Freelancers are given guns to use. Tex continually outsmarts her opponents. In the ninth round Maine and Wyoming purposely load their pistols with live ammunition, shocking York. Tex refuses York's help, telling him "Never abandon your team." A grenade is thrown and York is caught in the blast.
169	11	"Lifting the Veil"	September 5, 2011
York is gravely injured. The Director arrives, berates the Freelancers, and responds to Washington's claim that Maine and Wyoming weren't following protocol by saying the enemy will also not follow protocol on the battlefield. Carolina watches Tex being helped up by a trio of black-uniformed men, and sees Tex's shoulder spark. Back in Blood Gulch, the Blues are disoriented by the grenade explosion, which turned out to be a flashbang tossed by Tex. Simmons lures Lopez to the caves near the base. There, he plans on tricking Lopez into walking into a puddle of water that he electrified with a battery, but given Lopez overheard Simmons' plan to kill him, he goes around to another cave entry. Simmons attempts to catch up to him, only to be electrocuted by his own trap.
170	12	"Mid-Game Substitution"	September 12, 2011
Simmons finds himself chained up by Lopez, who is now disguised as him to get access to the equipment he needs to investigate the earthquakes. Simmons mistakenly believes that Lopez is trying to replace him to become popular. Lopez fools Sarge and Grif into granting him permission to use their equipment. A curious Donut investigates what the disguised Lopez is up to, while the real Simmons breaks free from his bonds and leaves to confront Lopez. As the Blues recover from the flashbang, Church lies to Tex, saying that their teammate "Andersmith" was killed and that they had removed his name from the roster. While Tex makes a call to Command, Church tells Tucker and Caboose that he lied to Tex so that she would stay in Blood Gulch a little longer to investigate the nonexistent death. Tex returns and says that they are going to "even the teams" by killing one of the Reds so that she can leave Blood Gulch as soon as possible, much to Church's dismay.
171	13	"Planning the Heist"	September 19, 2011
On the Project Freelancer ship, the Director briefs the Freelancers on their next mission. Members of the UNSC loyal to the Insurrection have acquired a high level asset, codenamed "Sarcophagus", and are holding it in a secure building. The first team—Carolina, Washington, and Maine —are tasked with infiltrating the storage facility. They are joined by York, whose quick recovery from his injuries surprises the other Freelancers. The second team, composed of North, Wyoming, and C.T., will act as recon for the first team before the infiltration, and afterwards ambush an official to obtain the key code necessary to access the asset. South is barred from participating in this mission. The Director evades the Freelancer's questions before they depart.
172	14	"Son of a Bitch"	October 3, 2011
At Blood Gulch, Tex tells Church to pick a member of the Red team and kill him. However, due to both his inaccuracy with the sniper rifle and his constant attempts to stall Tex, she takes Church's sniper rifle and shoots Lopez, still disguised as Simmons. As the Reds deliver a eulogy, Simmons arrives explaining the switch. Carolina's group infiltrates the target building, but as York bypasses a holographic lock, he accidentally sets off an alarm for several seconds. This prompts the UNSC forces to detect the alarm and send troops down to the vault to investigate.
173	15	"The Sarcophagus"	October 10, 2011
The Freelancers locate the Sarcophagus and haul it to the top of the building. Regrouping on the roof, they find Tex planting a transmitter for the Freelancer ship's main gun, which proceeds to fire and sends the Freelancers scrambling to escape.
174	16	"Hell's Angel"	October 17, 2011
In Blood Gulch, Church pleads with Tex not to leave. The Reds discover that the planet has become unstable and will collapse, leading Sarge to propose a plan to drill to the core and set off a bomb to fix it. North's team is pinned down on the freeway and is unable to reach their target, prompting Carolina and her team to reach the second team's rally point and intercept the target themselves.
175	17	"Spiral"	October 24, 2011
Tex reveals that she is aware that Church is really Epsilon and that she is also unaware of the Director's reasons for bringing her back as an AI. The Freelancers fight insurrectionists, recovering a briefcase from their target. Tex leaves on her own with the briefcase as the other Freelancers are extracted.
176	18	"Labor Pains"	October 31, 2011
Grif insults the Blue Team to make them mad enough for them to send a bomb to the Red Base for Sarge's plan. He eventually succeeds and Tex builds Andy the bomb. At Project Freelancer, the Director and the Counselor speak with a recently created and disoriented Delta. The new AI initially believes that he is Alpha but the Director quickly corrects him and directs Delta's attention away from the issue.
177	19	"Whole Lot of Shaking"	November 7, 2011
More earthquakes rock Blood Gulch, and fails to explode. The Blues get Sheila running and try to use her to get out of Blood Gulch before the cataclysm. Church decides to stay and tells them that if they find Washington to tell him that "memory is the key". Tex decides to stay behind with Church and both she and Church stand together to watch the end of the world. At Project Freelancer, York and North discuss how their situation had changed, and if they are still "the good guys" given recent fights with police and UNSC soldiers. Outside, South looks at the Freelancer rankings and turns away in disappointment when Tex becomes the new top ranking Freelancer. Later, Washington catches C.T. finishing a transmission to an unknown person.
178	20	"Hate to Say Goodbye"	November 14, 2011
At Blue Base Church explains to Tex that he figured out what the Director and Alpha could not. Tex was a by-product of the Director's longing to see Allison again. Church tells Tex, "I forget you," finally allowing her to leave his memories and move on. At peace, Church tells the world to do its worst, but he is rescued from the memory unit. In the past, Carolina is seen looking over the updated rankings, as she is dropped to second behind Tex. The Director approaches her and tells her that things are going to change and he needs her to do "a great many things", some of which might be questionable. Carolina agrees. Epsilon comes out of the capture unit, furious with Caboose and Sarge and questioning why they came to get him and risked so much. Caboose informs Church that they and the others fought through many soldiers to rescue him, and did it for "her", who knew how to get Church out, whom Church assumes to be Tex. Caboose corrects him that it is not Tex but the "new lady." A nearby door opens revealing Carolina, who tells Epsilon that now that she has found him, he's going to help her what she should have done years ago: kill the Director.

==== Season 10 (2012) ====
Carolina leads the Reds and Blues on a vengeful quest to find the Director of Project Freelancer: Dr. Leonard Church.

No. Overall	No. in Season	Title	Original release date
179	1	"Revenants"	May 28, 2012
In the past, York infiltrates an Insurrectionist facility in space. After he triggers an alarm, the Director decides on more direct measures and fires on the facility from the ship Mother of Invention, causing York to be dragged out into space. In the present, Church demands to know how Carolina survived. Washington appears, announcing that the UNSC forces can't be held off much longer, and Carolina races off to fight them. Washington remains behind and explains he has replaced Church on Blue team.
180	2	"Heavy Metal"	June 4, 2012
The Mother of Invention approaches the Insurrectionist facility, which responds by launching fighters. Invention sends Freelancers to the facility to capture the Insurrectionist leader. Carolina assigns the agents tasks for the mission, then notices that C.T. is missing. C.T. is then seen entering another part of the station via a hole in the hull, and confronts an elite Insurrectionist and two soldiers, who open fire.
181	3	"Follow the Leader"	June 11, 2012
C.T. is revealed to be working with the Insurrection. They discuss an artifact that the Insurrection has discovered. At the hangar, South reports that the Insurrectionist leader was not found and Carolina says they will look for him in a scrapyard. Washington and Carolina engage several soldiers while Grif, Tucker, and Simmons secure transport. After the enemy soldiers are killed, Church asks everyone why they decided to rescue him. Caboose explains that Carolina wants to find the Director and since Church has all of his memories, he may know where he is.
182	4	"Turbulence"	June 18, 2012
The Reds and Blues stop at Zanzibar. Washington and Carolina debate whether the Reds and Blues will be of use. In the past, as the strike team advances into the scrapyard, an Insurrectionist ship emerges from hiding and attacks the Mother of Invention before fleeing. Carolina reports their failure to capture the leader, and that C.T. is gone.
183	5	"The New Kid"	July 2, 2012
In the past, North introduces his new AI, Theta, to York, Washington and South. York uses his AI, Delta, to help Theta with its shyness. The Director arrives, to prepare a test for Theta and North, and reminds Delta that protocol prevents direct interaction between AIs. Theta's performance in the test impresses Washington and York. In present day, The Reds discuss being dragged along with the Blues on the mission and whether Carolina can be trusted. Elsewhere, Tucker and Church watch Washington enter a doorway in the facility.
184	6	"What's the "I" Stand For?"	July 9, 2012
Carolina looks for clues to the location of the Director with Washington, and tries to shoot Tucker and Church after they eavesdrop. The Reds plan on abandoning the mission and returning home, but change their minds once Washington tells them that due to their past actions, they are likely now criminals wanted by the UNSC. In the past, the Director and the Counselor teach the agents about how to care for the AIs. The A.I. Sigma (Elijah Wood), asks about the stage of AI rampancy known as metastability, which should theoretically make an AI human. The Counselor tells him that it is merely a theory. Sigma takes great interest in the concept, and after everyone leaves, creates the symbol of the Meta on a computer screen.
185	7	"Oversight"	July 16, 2012
In the present, Washington reports to Carolina that he has found nothing in the facility. They decide to move on to the ruins in the desert where Washington found C.T.'s helmet. The Blues discuss Epsilon's memories, and his difficulty determining which of his personalities they come from. In the past, Wyoming and Florida report C.T.'s defection. The Director tasks Carolina and Wyoming to kill C.T., preventing her armor technology from falling into enemy hands. York and North discuss the Alpha, who the A.I.s seem obsessed about and refer to as their "creator", rather than the Director.
186	8	"Fall From Heaven"	July 23, 2012
The Reds and Blues arrive at the desert, where Carolina and Wash search for C.T's remains. The Blues recall the events that happened in Recreation as well as what they are up to here. In the past, the Freelancers assault the Insurrectionist facility. Sigma appears over Maine's shoulder and asks him if one of the nearby elites is the one that shot him in the throat. When Maine growls in confirmation, Sigma orders him to charge.
187	9	"Fighting Fire"	August 6, 2012
In the present, The Reds and Blues have a meeting about Carolina's secrecy and motives, as they believe she cannot be trusted. The group decides to find out more about Carolina's motives and plans by inserting Church into her Mongoose. In the past, Maine effortlessly assists in finishing off the opposition. Sigma communicates directly with Delta, showing the roots of his desire to collect and unite all of the AI fragments. The Insurrectionists and C.T retreat into a bunker while the Freelancers regroup.
188	10	"C.T."	August 13, 2012
Washington and Carolina approach where Washington saw C.T.'s helmet, wondering how C.T. ended up there. Carolina then tells him what happened back at the Longshore Shipyards. C.T. and the Insurrection Leader plan to escape the facility, but C.T. tries to tell him that the Freelancers might help them if they were told the whole story from their point of view. Tex and Carolina storm the bunker. C.T. attempts to convince them of the Director's crimes, but the two will have none of it. The four fight before Tex fatally wounds C.T. The Leader drags C.T. into an escape pod. Before dying, C.T. gives him a card detailing the Director's crimes, and the Leader puts on her helmet, revealing that the C.T. the Reds and Blues encountered has been the Leader. In the present, Washington is surprised at the truth as Carolina retrieves what she was looking for; the card with information about the Director.
189	11	"Out of Body"	August 20, 2012
Washington and Carolina study the data they salvaged . Tucker recognizes data on an artifact, and Caboose admits that he had lost the artifact shortly after it was damaged when Church transferred to a new body. Carolina decides to go off alone to visit an abandoned fortress on a nearby island, taking the Mongoose in which Epsilon was installed into with her. In the past, the Chairman chastises the Director for letting C.T. and her armor escape. York and North keep an eye on a frustrated Carolina, and while they talk about each other's AIs, they conclude that all of the AIs seem anxious about something.
190	12	"Out of Mind"	August 27, 2012
Carolina arrives at the abandoned island fortress where York was killed during the events of Out of Mind. Church reveals himself and asks Carolina what her motivations are and why she can't trust the Reds and Blues. Church and Carolina begin to bond, and Church agrees to analyze the Director's diary logs for any information. Back at the alien temple, the Reds and Blues become increasingly anxious about Carolina's motives. Shortly after, Carolina returns to the alien temple and tells everybody to get ready to move back into Valhalla.
191	13	"Greenish-Blue With Envy"	September 3, 2012
After returning to Vahalla, Church, Carolina, and Washington decide to go inspect the crashed Pelican where Tex's previous body is, forbidding the rest from going along. Tucker angrily confronts Church over how close he and Carolina seem to have become. The Reds decide to go find and repair Lopez so they can get a numerical advantage against the Blues. Caboose rushes off to the Blue Base, leaving Tucker all by himself. In the past, Carolina is frustrated over how she cannot beat Tex. Sigma and Gamma point out that Tex's superior abilities may stem from her AI, Omega. Carolina demands an AI of her own. The Director points out that Eta and Iota are due to be implanted into Washington and South Dakota, but Carolina demands that she have both AIs. The Director grudgingly accepts her request.
192	14	"New and Improved"	September 10, 2012
In the present, as Caboose gives Tucker a tour of their new base, Church, Carolina, and Washington examine the Pelican wreck. Church downloads himself into the Pelican's computer to see if he can obtain any information from Sheila. In the past, South is furious when she learns that Carolina has taken her and Washington's AI and wonders why she gets such preferential treatment. As York and Washington await for Carolina at the recovery room, they observe that Maine has been suffering side effects of AI implantation. Carolina wakes up and demands a test of her skills.
193	15	"Three's a Crowd"	September 17, 2012
The Director arrives, angry that an unauthorized match is taking place. Seeing that Texas is involved, he shouts "No, Allison!". The other agents with AIs collapse as they AIs also scream. On the training floor, Omega implores Texas to "end" Carolina, but she holds back, and instead knocks Carolina unconscious, telling her it is for her own good. Finding nothing at the ship, Carolina orders Washington to tell the teams to prepare to move out again. Meanwhile, Sarge and Simmons find Lopez, now propped up as a scarecrow in the garden of a makeshift hut. Donut walks out, having heard their voices, and reveals that his life was preserved by an armor lockdown. Doc approaches from behind and greets them, greatly upsetting Sarge.
194	16	"Happy Birthday"	September 24, 2012
In the present, Carolina tells the Red and Blue teams that they are leaving, much to their dismay. Sarge and Simmons return, telling Grif about how Donut is still alive and living with Doc and Lopez. Church asks Carolina to talk privately with him. In the past Carolina has been in a coma since the accident. Tex informs North that South had filed a request to take one of Carolina's AIs, a move that disgusts him, and that she believes using her AI is too dangerous. North to believe that the Freelancers are nothing but the Director's guinea pigs. The Director and the Counselor oversee the AIs torturing the Alpha, forcing it to create a new AI fragment. The Director bring in the Sarcophagus, which contains an alien. The Director asks the alien to "fix" an AI memory unit, giving birth to a new AI fragment, Epsilon.
195	17	"Remember Me How I Was"	October 1, 2012
At Valhalla, Grif and Simmons debate hunting the Director, as unlike the Freelancers, they have no personal vendetta against the Director. Sarge believes killing the Director will not make things better. Carolina notices Tex's dog tags from the Pelican and find that it is actually C.T.'s. Church notices it has some data stored in it and searches it at Carolina's request. In the past, Tex investigates the dog tags and finds a message from C.T. directly to her stating that she has left behind a copy of the data she took about the Director's misdeeds and sent this to her. Tex becomes incensed upon discovering that she is the AI unit Beta. Meanwhile, Washington has gone through surgery and just as Epsilon is implanted in him, severe hallucinations of Allison start to occur sending Wash into extreme pain and unconsciousness. Eventually he is sedated and sent to recovery. Church exits the data file in the dog tag and states that he now knows how to find the Director.
196	18	"Change of Plans"	October 8, 2012
After Washington regains consciousness following the botched implantation of Epsilon, North explains that the incident made all future AI projects be cancelled, with the existing AIs due to be confiscated by the Director. Carolina angrily protests against the idea of having her AIs taken. Tex has reportedly gone rogue, but North is skeptical. Elsewhere in the base, Tex breaks into a secure vault with York's help, telling him that there's someone she needs to see. Maine is prepares for battle as the Meta. In the present, Carolina and Church gather the Red and Blue teams. They announce that they have found the Director and tracked him to an old Freelancer base he could be at. The Reds immediately balk at the plan, not wanting to be dragged further into the personal vendetta. Carolina attempts to force them to comply at gunpoint, but is stopped by a furious Washington, who says he already feels responsible for causing them enough problems. Church rants on the Reds and Blues for past problems they caused. The Reds and Blues leave the room and Washington warns Carolina that she needs to figure out the difference between her enemies and friends.
197	19	"Party Crasher"	October 15, 2012
After breaking into the Mother of Invention, Tex begins making her way to the labs, finding South along the way, with North confronting his sister to let Tex go through. York assists Tex by hacking into the ship's systems. The Director orders Carolina to stop Tex. York asks Carolina to let go of her rivalry with Tex and flee Project Freelancer with him, but Carolina refuses and defeats York. While fighting Tex, the Mother of Invention goes out of control and crash lands, ejecting Carolina from the ship and knocking her out. Tex finds Alpha and tries to convince him to leave with her. However, Alpha does not remember Tex and is reluctant to leave the ship. Disappointed that Alpha does not remember her, Tex has a short chat with him before logging out of the system. Outside, Carolina regains consciousness to see Maine approaching her. Maine takes both of her AIs and then throws her off a nearby cliff. The Director and his forces begin to regroup, forcing Tex to flee the scene. The AIs materialize next to Maine as Sigma promises the Meta will find Tex.
198	20	"Reckless"	October 22, 2012
With the Red and Blue teams refusing to help them, Church and Carolina decide to try to find the Director themselves. They arrive at the Freelancer facility and are able to find FILSS, who mentions that the Director had entered the facility years ago but has not left since. Meanwhile, in Valhalla, the Red and Blue Teams are continuing their "war", with the Reds attempting to negotiate with the Blues to get their flag back by giving up their stuff, leading to an argument between Washington and Grif once the Meta's Brute Shot, which Grif had kept as a trophy, is brought in. Doc asks the teams whether they really are okay with letting Church leave by himself, noting that their past adventures had changed them for the better. Realizing this, the Reds and Blues decide to go after Church. Washington attempts to stop them, saying they are being too reckless facing almost impossible odds, to which Sarge points out that being stupid and reckless helped them get things done even against the more competent Freelancers, who lacked the one thing the Red and Blue Teams have: a team they could count on. Wash agrees, and when he points out Carolina and Church have a head start, a trio of UNSC Hornet gunships arrives to arrest them, unknowingly proving Wash's theory that he and the Reds and Blues are indeed wanted criminals. The Reds and Blues hijack the Hornets, strand the UNSC soldiers at Valhalla and fly off to find Church and Carolina. Back at the Freelancer facility, Church and Carolina note how the facility seems to be completely abandoned, while overhearing a recording of Allison the Director is playing. After arming herself with rifles found in the armory, Carolina enters a teleporter to confront the Director. However, they instead end up in a room filled with robotic copies that resemble Tex. Church reveals that the Director had never stopped trying to create a perfect copy of Allison, and these robots were the byproducts of his obsession. The robots then awaken and get ready to attack.
199	21	"True Colors"	October 29, 2012
Carolina charges at the robots and attacks, using her skill and weaponry to her full advantage. However she and Church are eventually overwhelmed by the intensity of the fight, leading Carolina to break down, lamenting that she can't and never will beat Tex. As the robots close in for the kill, Donut suddenly destroys them with several plasma grenades and Wash helps Carolina to her feet. She is surprised to see that the Reds and Blues have returned, and Wash reminds her that "they're not so bad once you get to know them." When Church tells them he thought that this isn't the Reds and Blues' fight, Sarge replies that they couldn't resist taking on a mission with overwhelming odds with little to no chance of success. Church and Tucker then exchange some words of thanks and apology. However, the robots begin to regroup, and are ready for another round. Her morale restored, Carolina tells the teams to 'lock and load'. The former Freelancers and the Reds and Blues work as a team and lay waste to the majority of the robots, but are slowly being overwhelmed. Wash tells Church to find the real Tex so he can shut down the army. Church enters the data storage unit where Tex is being kept. He finds her in a similar predicament to what Alpha was in many years ago; Tex has been so broken down that she doesn't even recognize him or have any remembrance of her own name. Church reminds her of their relationship and comforts her, telling her to rest, which Tex wearily, but happily complies to. Church says goodbye, to which Tex recalls that she has always hated goodbyes, which Church replies that he knows why. Back in the facility, all the Tex copies shut down as a result of Church's actions. The Reds and Blues take a moment to savor their victory, but Wash grimly reminds them that they still have to deal with the Director. Church however replies that what they have to do next, he and Carolina must do it alone, preparing for a final showdown with the Director.
200	22	"Don't Say It"	November 5, 2012
Church and Carolina find the Director in a room with FILSS watching a video file of Allison leaving to join the military again. The Director repeatedly says that he needs more time to bring Allison back and that he's close, but Church ignores it and calls him off on all of the actions the Director has to answer for, such as what he done to him, Carolina, Wash, Tex and all the others he hurt all just to bring back a shadow, and he has to pay for all. Carolina looks at the Director in disappointment as he looks back at her, showing that they both have the same eye color. Realizing killing the Director won't solve anything nor heal past wounds, Carolina tells Church to leave, but he claims that they came all this way to kill the Director, though Carolina reminds him that they both need to let it go. She also says that the past doesn't define a person for who he or she is, but that it's a starting point to what they will become. After leaving a pistol for the Director at his request, Carolina kisses him on the forehead and leaves, just as the Director says to her "You were my greatest creation." As Church leaves, the Director orders FILSS to delete all files dealing with Project Freelancer, including FILSS, except the video of Allison and to shut down every Project Freelancer facility, including the one he is in. FILSS warns him that doing so will shut off the life support system in the facility, though the Director insists. Before shutting down, FILSS asks him if Project Freelancer was a success. He says no but claims he came very close, and as the Director and FILSS say their goodbyes to each other, the door to the room lowers down, sealing the Director in. Outside the facility, Church and Carolina acknowledge that the journey is over. They thank each other for showing the other a different side of themselves after all they've been through. Carolina then asks Church about where the Reds and Blues will go now, as Church answers that there's one place they haven't been to yet the Reds and Blues can call home. In the past at Freelancer Command, the Director and the Counselor discuss where to hide the Alpha. The Counselor points out that the Alpha will need a security detail, someone they can trust, so he nominates Agent Florida, who turns out to be Captain Flowers. The Director mentions they will need a cover story for Flowers' "disappearance", as the Counselor has the state of Florida break into several pieces on a computer screen behind them. Then the Director points out that they will need a place to put the Alpha where no one will be able to think to look for it, and the Counselor says he believes he knows such a place. Back in the present, the Reds and Blues begin to rebuild after crash landing on an unknown planet as Church and Carolina watch over them. Carolina then tells Church that military equipment had recently been stolen from Project Freelancer by some low level soldiers, pointing out they should get them, hoping to do good things to replace all the bad things they have done. Down in the crash site, Caboose calls to Church to come down with him, but realizes Church and Carolina are gone. Tucker asks Caboose if he found Church and where he may have gone to. Caboose replies no and that he does not know where Church is, but says that he is somewhere but is not here right now. As Caboose and Tucker head inside their new home, Church's sniper rifle is left lying on a hill overlooking the canyon of the crash site.

=== The Chorus Trilogy ===
==== Season 11 (2013) ====
The Reds and Blues crash-land on a mysterious planet and wait to be rescued. However, mysterious forces are watching them.

No. Overall	No. in Season	Title	Original release date
201	1	"One-Zero-One"	June 14, 2013
In the first journal entry from Washington, he admits it's been awhile since doing these, deciding to get up to speed. Washington recalls the corruption of Project Freelancer, its demise, his job as Recovery One, and Project Freelancer using the Reds and Blues as cannon fodder for their agents in training. The only people Wash could trust are the Reds and Blues, and they were able to bring down Project Freelancer, and the Director once and for all. Wash mentions that they are shipwrecked, crashed on their way home, fearing that if help doesn't come soon, someone else may find them first. Finishing his entry, Wash hears the Blue's tank fire, and sees that Sarge and Simmons are using it on Red Base, though Grif is still inside. Wash asks the Reds who gave them the tank, but quickly realizes Caboose gave it to them. Sarge says that he's renovating their base, also mentioning how unfair it is that the Blue's base is under the crashed ship and Grif complains that they are closer to the food storage. Wash tells them that they need to ration the food they have, as they need to fix the communications dish to call for help. Caboose and Wash take the tank back to Blue Base.
202	2	"Get Your Tucks in a Row"	June 24, 2013
Caboose and Wash take the tank back to Blue Base, where Wash reminds Tucker that no one is to touch the tank. Wash also reminds Tucker that until they're rescued, they need to be more mindful of the resources they have and to report to him about anything. Wash then says that with Church and Carolina gone, he's responsible for holding the team together. Tucker then makes a badly timed joke about the crashed ship's entire crew dying at the time of the crash. At Red Base, Sarge continues to complain about the base layout such as the sandbags in the west wing. Grif agrees with him by also mentioning the hole in the base's roof. Simmons, having designed the layout, doesn't see the problem. He says it's the ideal place for his garden and that it's under the damaged engine of the ship to keep them warm, though Sarge mentions the huge amounts of radiation the engine gives off.
203	3	"Barriers to Entry"	July 1, 2013
At Blue Base, Wash has Tucker do push ups as part of physical training, which frustrates Tucker. Tucker asks why Caboose isn't doing the training like he is, with Wash answering that Caboose is having one of his "off days". Wash then has Tucker run laps around the canyon. Later, Wash finds Caboose standing in front of a mirror, depressed because Church is gone. Wash tries to comfort Caboose, but Caboose goes on a walk by himself still depressed, leaving Wash to ponder on what he's going to do with him. At Red Base, Sarge is still complaining about the base layout. This time he complains about the interior of the base, saying he needs a personal room for himself to ponder his accomplishments and his "non-existent" failures, though Grif calls it Sarge's "Denial" room. In the end, Sarge decides to keep one half of the base to himself and leaving the other half to Grif and Simmons, which leads Grif to immediately set ground rules.
204	4	"Heavy Mettle"	July 8, 2013
Caboose is walking around the canyon, still depressed about Church being gone. He then hears a noise and goes to investigate, finding something in pile of debris. Back at Blue Base, Wash now has Tucker run an obstacle course he constructed. Soon after Tucker finishes the obstacle course, Caboose returns excited. Wash tries to get Caboose to run the course, which Caboose completes almost immediately, saying afterward he needs to do something. Wash immediately ends training for the day and decides to work on the communications dish. At Red Base, Grif and Simmons already get into an argument about their new living arrangements, such as Grif using Simmons' toothbrush and where to put the dishes. Simmons tries to get Sarge to reconsider the base arrangements, though Sarge says they all need to make sacrifices, except for him because he's team leader. Wash arrives and asks for a toolkit for the communications dish. As Grif leads Wash to retrieve tools, Simmons mentions that they recovered a robot building kit from the crashed ship and suggests they can re-purpose it to fix the dish, but Sarge ignores him and instead decides to build a new robot to fix the dish for them.
205	5	"A Real Fixer Upper"	July 15, 2013
At Blue Base, Wash is working on the communications dish with Tucker. Tucker comments that they and the others should have been founded by now, remembering that the crashed ship's GPS locator should have activated when they crash landed (A flashback shows Tucker's part in the ship crash-landing by flirting and distracting the female pilot.). Wash grows frustrated about not having all the tools needed to fix the dish, thinking the Reds took some. Tucker tries to calm Wash down, saying that if they were in Blood Gulch, they would be doing the same thing, though Wash believes that they are being watched by someone. Wash eventually agrees with Tucker that they should have been rescued by now. Meanwhile, Caboose is working to free an unseen item get loose, wondering how the item got there. Caboose assures the item to not worry as they are going to be best friends. Back at Red Base, Sarge is working on building a new robot, while Grif and Simmons talk about science-fiction movies and TV shows that had robot domination. Sarge finishes the robot, who coincidentally looks like Lopez and also only speaks Spanish, much to the chagrin of Grif and Simmons. Still not able to understand Spanish, the Reds assume the robot, now called Lopez Dos.0, is stupid. Sarge eventually has Lopez Dos.0 go work on the communications dish.
206	6	"S.O.S."	July 22, 2013
Caboose has finally finished fixing an unseen item in a cavern. Meanwhile, Wash and Tucker are still trying to fix the communications tower. The Reds soon arrive and try to offer assistance, though Wash refuses, even turning down Lopez 2.0. Lopez 2.0 sees the problem with the dish and goes to fix it, causing the dish to finally come online. Wash sends out a mayday call, hoping to be rescued. The mayday is eventually answered by none other than Donut, surprising everyone. Sarge has Donut write down the coordinates of where they last were, as the Reds and Blues have no idea of exactly where they are. Soon after the dish goes offline again, the Reds and Blues begin celebrating for the eventual rescue, but Wash warns them that it might take days before then. Caboose finally joins the others, and ecstatically introduces them to "Freckles", an A.I.-controlled Mantis, which leaves everyone speechless. Elsewhere, in a swamp, an unknown soldier hears Wash's mayday call.
207	7	"Can I Keep It?"	July 28, 2013
At Blue Base, Caboose shows off Freckles to Tucker and Wash, who argue about why it's called a Mantis due to the similarities of the insect. Caboose tells them he found Freckles under debris and was able to free it. Soon, Wash mentions that they need to continue training until they're rescued and to be prepared for anything, despite Tucker seeing no point in it. He changes his mind when threatened by Freckles for disobeying a direct order from a commanding officer. Wash leaves for the crashed ship to do an inventory check on the Reds and Blues' food supply, but once inside the ship, he passes the food storage to do something else. At Red Base, Sarge is disgruntled about the Blues having a better robot than Lopez 2.0. He gathers Grif and Simmons after they argued once again about chores. Sarge believes that the Blues are up to no good, and orders Grif and Simmons to do recon on the Blues, despite them being afraid of Freckles. Sarge decides to stay behind to step up "security" when one of the sand bags rips open. Grif and Simmons head to Blue Base, despite Simmons' doubts of Sarge's suspicions.
208	8	"The Grass is Greener. The Blues are Bluer."	August 15, 2013
At Blue Base, Caboose, Tucker and Freckles are doing their routine exercises. Meanwhile, Grif and Simmons eventually arrive unseen to do recon. Quickly, they both realize that the Blues aren't doing anything suspicious and that it's a waste of time, with Grif mentioning watching the Blues exercise is weird. Grif suggests they just talk to them, but Simmons mentions about Freckles trying to kill them. They're eventually discovered by Tucker, who tells them that it's weird that they're watching him and Caboose exercise. Simmons tells him that Sarge made him and Grif spy on them because he thinks that they're up to something, though Tucker tells them that all he and Caboose do is train and do chores. Tucker also mentions an organizational chart Wash has, which makes Simmons very interested. Simmons decides to stay at the Blue Base for a few days, but Grif heads back to Red Base. Meanwhile, Caboose plays fetch with Freckles and throws a ball near Simmons, who is nearly shot by Freckles.
209	9	"A House Divided, Then Multiplied"	August 19, 2013
At Red Base, Grif returns and reports to Sarge that the Blues aren't planning anything, and that Simmons has decided to stay with the Blues. Sarge goes crazy upon hearing the news and believes that the Blues have betrayed them, captured Simmons, and that the Red vs. Blue war has started all over again. As he goes on about this being a conspiracy that has been in motion for years, Sarge then orders an unwilling Grif to prepare an attack on the Blues. Meanwhile, at Blue Base, Caboose is teaching Freckles new tricks while Tucker is quickly exasperated with Simmons' presence. Wash then returns and asks why Tucker isn't doing his daily drills, starting a heated argument with Wash saying he just wants the Blues to be prepared for any potential threat, though Tucker believes that Wash is simply far too paranoid because of past misfortunes of him being constantly betrayed. As they argue, the mysterious soldier observes them from afar with a sniper scope. Simmons then arrives, telling Wash that he will be staying in Blue Base now, further exasperating him. Suddenly, Sarge and Grif attempt to ambush the Blues with their warthog but crash into a boulder, and both sides are left at a standoff. Grif takes a moment to point out that the ambush wasn't his idea.
210	10	"Long Live the King"	August 26, 2013
During the standoff, Sarge accuses the Blues of kidnapping Simmons, though the Blues point out that Simmons joined them willingly. Sarge brands Simmons a traitor and prepares to attack the Blues. Wash and Tucker get into another argument, with Wash wondering why Tucker is so resistant to his orders, and Tucker complaining the Blues are worse off with Wash as the leader; they sarcastically decide to promote Caboose as Blue leader, with Caboose accepting the "nomination." Freckles, taking Tucker and Wash's words literally, promotes Caboose to Blue leader and warns Tucker and Wash that any attempts to disobey Caboose's orders will be punishable by death. Upon hearing this, Simmons tries to return to the Reds, but is threatened by Freckles for desertion. Sarge tries to attack, but Freckles destroys his warthog. Undaunted, Sarge prepares to charge, when they are interrupted by a pistol shot. Both teams see that Donut has arrived, bringing along Doc and Lopez (who is now just a head again). However, Donut tells them he had told their ship to leave so he could rescue them himself. Enraged by his stupidity, both teams band together and beat up Donut. Meanwhile, the mysterious green armored soldier watches both teams from a cliff with his sniper rifle, muttering "Unfortunate" to himself before cloaking.
211	11	"Worst Laid Plans"	September 2, 2013
At Blue Base, the Blues discuss their plans for the day. Caboose, now the appointed leader of the Blues, orders Tucker to fix the communications dish, Wash to go out on lookout duty, and Simmons to do whatever he typically does for the Reds. At Red Base, Doc finishes tending to Donut's wounds, and talks to Grif, who claims the ship crashed for no reason (in truth he spilled soda on the instruments). Sarge calls the Red team to order, believing that Wash and the Blues have taken charge for far too long; in order to facilitate rescue, the top priority is to assassinate Freckles and rescue Simmons. Sarge reasons the ship that carried Freckles must have carried weapons powerful enough to destroy it. Sarge and Grif set out for the ship, leaving Donut to guard Red Base. Wash, still on lookout duty for the Blues, arrives; he asks if the Reds saw anything unusual, which they deny. Elsewhere, a ship docks at a fueling station, and the pilot talks to an attendant about the Reds and Blues' crashed ship. Before he can report the crash site, the pilot is killed by the green armored soldier. The soldier, named Locus, radios to someone his objective is complete and is returning to "Crash Site Bravo".
212	12	"Finders Keepers"	September 9, 2013
At Blue Base, Tucker returns just after failing to fix the communications dish. Simmons asks how they power the gravity lift, and Tucker explains their base has a direct line to the ship, giving them almost unlimited electricity and power. Simmons decides to borrow some of the ship's power for a "side project". When Wash reports to Caboose, the latter asks Wash how Freckles would look in a sombrero, at which point Wash quickly leaves. On top of a nearby cliff, a mysterious soldier in steel and orange armor observes the Blues, and becomes alarmed when he realizes Locus is watching them as well. Meanwhile Sarge, Grif, and Doc break into the ship, and begin searching for weapons. Searching the ships records, they find the ship was carrying a large amount of experimental weaponry, though most of it was located in the other half of the ship when it broke off. They find experimental teleportation cubes, which Grif instantly takes a liking to; Sarge discovers a robot even more massive than Freckles, instantly falling in love with it, deciding to dismantle it and take it back to Red Base. They then spot Wash wandering through the armory. Wash uses the materials inside to build some sort of device, muttering to himself "Never thought it'd come down to this. Sorry Caboose."
213	13	"+1 Follower"	September 16, 2013
At Blue Base, Simmons reveals his invention to Wash and Tucker: an inter-canyon communications system, dubbed "Basebook", giving them a direct communication line between the bases. Meanwhile, at Red Base, the Reds smuggle most of the robot parts out of the ship, with the exception of various pieces Grif left behind. Grif proposes using the teleportation cubes to get rid of Freckles, but Doc is worried about potential side effects. Sarge orders Grif to either test the cubes, or the robot's defense systems by acting as the target. Doc and Donut leave to update their Basebook profiles. Lopez and Lopez 2.0 observe the Reds, and are approached by the mysterious orange and steel soldier. He tells the Lopezes that he's trying to arrange for the group's rescue and warns them that someone else is watching them. Alarmed, Lopez 2.0 tries to warn Sarge, but is ignored. Lopez tells Lopez 2.0 that he shouldn't bother, and that their creators are terrible people. Lopez then decides to tell Lopez 2.0 the full story about the Reds, which he states will take about 20 hours and he only likes telling it in five minute intervals.
214	14	"Reconciliation"	September 23, 2013
At Red Base, Donut and Doc mess around with Basebook, despite the only other subscribers being Simmons and Caboose. Donut says that he spent the day cleaning Red Base, in which Doc tells him about Grif's stuff on the roof. Angered at Grif's sloppiness, Donut confronts him, takes one of the teleportation cubes, using it to store Grif's stuff. He then tosses the cube all the way to Blue Base, much to Simmons' despair as it landed near him. At the comms tower, Wash tries to help Tucker fix it, but Tucker declines due to his frustration with Wash's leadership. Wash admits that he was the worst of the Freelancers in his old squad, and after Church and Carolina left, he had to assume a leadership position, which he never held before. Tucker tells Wash not to take his position so seriously, and Wash encourages Tucker to fix the radio, as he can be a great soldier if he applies the effort (It's revealed Wash was also partly responsible for the ship crashing, by accidentally knocking a cable out of a wall.). Tucker then realizes he forgot to turn on the radio, which was why it wasn't working. Caboose arrives with Freckles, ordering them to return to Blue Base and clean up Grif's stuff. Wash has Tucker distract Caboose, while he goes back to the ship to finish something that can "put a stop to this". Elsewhere, Locus arrives at a military base filled with white colored soldiers; he approaches four soldiers, telling them "We're going hunting".
215	15	"Neighborhood Watch"	September 30, 2013
Lopez finishes telling Lopez 2.0 the story about the reds, leaving 2.0 shocked at their treatment of him. Lopez encourages his successor to insult Sarge, who is oblivious to what the two robots are saying. At Blue Base, Washington returns from the ship, but is cut-off by Freckles, declaring that Washington has failed to follow Caboose's orders. Freckles prepares to eliminate Washington, but is stopped by Caboose. Wash talks to Caboose, apologizing that Church left without a goodbye, and adds that he was wrong to leave him to deal with it himself. Wash then shows his creation; a new version of Caboose's old helmet. Caboose is overjoyed with his gift, and turns leadership role back to Wash, which Freckles concedes, before the visor on Caboose's helmet shorts out. Back at Red Base, the Reds finish constructing their Mantis, though Grif points out that it's half the size of Freckles, and on fire. However Sarge is pleased with it. The Mantis identifies itself as Cyclops, and immediately reads the Reds and Doc as enemies; it reads sixteen targets in the canyon, but quickly runs out of diesel. Donut questions Mantis' reading, before they hear shooting at Blue Base. There, four white soldiers are fighting the Blues. When the Reds come running over, the orange soldier arrives and saves Wash from a sniper. However, the orange soldier is shot in the leg. Locus appears, congratulating the Reds and Blues before ordering them to come with him. They refuse and Wash orders Freckles to attack, but Locus cloaks and disappears. The orange soldier asks if anyone could patch up his leg, and Doc goes off to get some orange juice.
216	16	"FAQ"	October 7, 2013
Doc treats the steel and orange soldier's injured leg, while Wash interrogates him. The soldier introduces himself as Felix, and reveals to the Reds and Blues that the planet they're on is called Chorus. A former UNSC colony at the edge of colonized space, Chorus had been forgotten by the UNSC after the Great War. Simmons wonders how they could have gotten so off course, though Sarge tells him to not worry - as it's revealed that Sarge tampered with the ship's engines. Felix explains that since being forgotten, Chorus' citizens tried to govern themselves, which led to a civil war between two factions; the Federal Army of Chorus (dubbed the Feds) and a rebel group called the New Republic; Felix works as a mercenary for the latter. Felix explains that the New Republic sent him to convince the Reds and Blues to join their cause, as their exploits against Project Freelancer gave them a reputation as great soldiers. However, the Reds and Blues refuse, wishing to leave the planet. Felix radios New Republic command to send reinforcements to his position, knowing that Locus - another mercenary, working for the Feds - knows where they are. Felix informs the Reds and Blues that they'll need to fortify the canyon with defenses as Locus and the Feds are coming for them.
217	17	"Ready...Aim..."	October 14, 2013
When the Reds finish their fortifications, Simmons shows a minefield he set up, while Grif and Doc show off the teleportation cubes. During a demonstration, Doc is accidentally hit by a cube and disappears. Sarge orders Lopez and Lopez Dos.0 to prep C.C. for repairs. Knowing that C.C. will attack, Lopez and Dos.0 reluctantly obey. Having his will broken, Dos.0 starts repairing C.C., when Lopez suggests uploading himself into C.C, and taking their revenge. Instead, Dos.0 decides to upload himself into C.C. At Blue Base, Tucker fixes Caboose's helmet visor, but the radio is broken in the process. Wash asks Felix about Locus; he is told Locus is an unstable individual. Felix asks Wash where Church and Carolina are, with the latter saying that they left shortly after the crash-landing. Wash asks Felix about Locus' cloaking device; Felix states that the Feds have access to the advanced technology compared to the New Republic. Preparing for the battle, Wash dons his old steel and yellow armor. As the Reds and Blues finish setting up defenses, Wash believes with Freckles and the Blues' tank, they have a chance against the Feds. However, a Dos.0-controlled C.C. chases Sarge down, getting into a standoff with Freckles. Locus arrives, offering a final chance to surrender. When Grif mocks Locus for being alone, an army of Federal Army soldiers decloaks behind Locus. With no other options, Wash fires his rifle at the Feds.
218	18	"Fire"	October 21, 2013
A firefight ensues between the Feds and the Reds and Blues, while Freckles fights against Lopez Dos.0. Sarge and Simmons use the Blues' tank and quickly eliminate several Feds. The Feds retaliate by sending a rocket-mounted warthog. However, Grif uses his teleportation cubes to have the warthog fall on a squad of Feds. Freckles becomes damaged and starts losing power, but is rescued by Donut before Dos.0 can finish it off. Donut uses a teleportation cube on Dos.0, tossing him into the minefield, destroying him. Locus fires a sticky grenade at the tank, destroying it as Sarge and Simmons narrowly escape. The Reds and Blues begin running low on ammo as more Feds arrive. Simmons and Wash head to Blue Base to recharge Freckles, but the process is slow. They learn the slow recharge is coming from Red Base, with Donut downloading Freckles' "high-quality" picture on Basebook draining the ship's power supply. Locus sets off a grenade explosion that incapacitates Donut. Tucker charges to the Red Base to cancel the download, and is rescued by Lopez (now in Dos.0's robot body) from a Fed soldier. Even with Freckles recharged, the Feds still have the upper hand; Sarge and Wash are knocked out by Locus, and Lopez is sniped before New Republic reinforcements arrive. Locus single-handedly takes out several troops; Felix takes Tucker, Caboose, Grif and Simmons to retreat through the caves. Wash recovers, and orders Freckles to "shake" (stomp his foot), causing a rockslide to block the cave entrance, allowing Felix, Tucker, Caboose, Grif and Simmons to escape. Wash is then knocked out again by Locus.
219	19	"Lost But Not Forgotten"	October 28, 2013
Tucker, having been knocked out by the falling boulders, wakes up in a medical bay with Felix at his side. They are in the New Republic's headquarters, Felix reveals to Tucker's horror that they had to leave behind the others. Tucker is introduced to the New Republic's leader, Vanessa Kimball, who informs him that Caboose, Grif and Simmons are at their mess hall. After Tucker leaves, Kimball informs Felix he is not getting fully paid due to what happened. Tucker reunites with Caboose, Grif and Simmons and they are called into Kimball's office. Kimball tells them that the rest of the Reds and Blues have been taken captive by the Feds, and promises to help them in return for fighting for the New Republic. The Reds and Blues are reluctant, but agree when Kimball appeals to them. The Reds and Blues head outside, and meet several young Rebel soldiers. Tucker orders them to start doing drills, to Grif's displeasure. In a post-credits scene, Locus speaks to his superior, and informs him that they recovered the crate they sought, though the Reds and Blues tried to open it. Locus' superior doubts they knew what was inside. Locus asks if keeping Sarge, Donut and Wash alive was the best course of action, but his superior then tells him that they will continue with their plans. It's then revealed that Carolina had eavesdropped on the conversation.

==== Season 12 (2014) ====
The Reds and Blues are caught in the middle of a civil war on the former UNSC colony Chorus. But all is not as it seems as a mysterious, sinister force manipulates both sides.

No. Overall	No. in Season	Title	Original release date
220	1	"Oh Captains, My Captains"	April 28, 2014
In the first episode of the season, Caboose, Grif, Simmons (now all promoted to Captains along with Tucker) and their squads attempt to attack a Federal Army of Chorus compound. Grif nearly blows their cover when he tries to change his squad's name from Gold to Orange, which annoys Simmons as he tries to bypass the compound's gate. When the gate does open, Caboose goes in guns blazing, not realizing there is another gate to get through, after which it opens and Caboose goes in guns blazing again. Grif becomes annoyed when Simmons doesn't scold Caboose for risking blowing their cover, and then comments on Simmon's inability to communicate with his all-female squad, which makes Simmons remember his time at junior high. Caboose, Grif and Simmons then initiate the attack on the FAC compound, but quickly falls apart as the squads become unorganized. A horn is blown, and it is revealed that it is a training exercise. Vanessa Kimball comes out, upset over the squads' inability to work together and cracking under pressure. Kimball tells Caboose, Grif and Simmons to encourage their squads to do better next time, but not to lie to them. Meanwhile, Tucker, Felix and their squad are out on a mission scouting a FAC outpost.
221	2	"Hit and Run"	May 5, 2014
Felix, Tucker and his squad (Palomo, Rogers and Cunningham) scout a heavily defended FAC outpost, which Felix decides to sabotage with sticky detonators. To make it easier, Tucker has Rogers and Cunningham knockout two FAC soldiers and use their armor as disguises, with Palomo guarding their escape route. Tucker overhears that a high-ranking FAC officer came in from the city where Sarge, Donut, Wash and Lopez may be held. Tucker holds a FAC soldier at gunpoint, forcing him to download crucial intelligence, including where the captured Reds and Blues are. As Tucker waits on the flash drive to download intelligence, Cunningham and arrives warns that their cover may be blown. Tucker receives the downloaded flash drive and cloaks, but Cunningham is immediately killed by Locus, who orders two of his men to sound the alarm for the infiltration. Locus almost discovers Tucker, but leaves when he hears an explosion set off by Felix. Rogers is mistaken as a bomb disarmament specialist in the confusion. Tucker and Felix make it back to Palomo at the escape route, where Tucker tells Felix that Locus killed Cunningham. Felix immediately detonates the rest of the sticky bombs, despite Rogers being next to one of the sticky bombs which detonates.
222	3	"Something Else Entirely"	May 12, 2014
At the New Republic HQ, Grif tells the Rebels about how he, the Reds, and Blues fought against the Meta, when Kimball calls him Caboose, and Simmons to her office. Tucker and Felix return from obtaining key FAC intelligence, albeit resulting in Cunningham and Rogers' deaths. Kimball reveals the captive Reds and Blues are held at a northern compound; but the FAC move them regularly. and Felix warns that the compound is twice the size of the one they just raided. Kimball tells the Reds and Blues that she envisioned them as ideal soldiers, but now sees them as misfits the Rebels relate to, raising their morale. She gives them five days to organize and prepare their squads to save their friends. When they discuss their situation, Felix tells them that since the New Republic has little money, he gets his cut from old alien weapons, which he sells. Felix offers to help them in exchange for a one-time fee, including Tucker's sword. When Tucker tries to convince Felix to help for free because it's the right thing to do, Felix counters the Reds and Blues wouldn't have joined the New Republic if their friends weren't captured. Felix states that everyone, even the Red's and Blue's, have their price.
223	4	"Teaming With Problems"	May 19, 2014
At the New Republic HQ, Caboose, Tucker, Grif and Simmons gather their lieutenants Smith, Bitters and Jensen (including Palomo) to discuss the upcoming mission to save the captured Reds and Blues. The guys tell the lieutenants and Palomo that they have five days to train and come up with a plan to save the captured Reds and Blues. Before the squads begin training, Smith, Caboose's lieutenant, asks who will be leading the team on the mission, which prompts an "election" with Caboose, Tucker, Grif and Simmons campaigning for leadership. Felix eventually arrives and comments on them wasting the morning with campaigning. Tucker, the last one to campaign, rants to the lieutenants he doesn't want to be a leader, but if it means saving the captured Reds and Blues he'll do it. Smith, Bitters, Jensen and Palomo all vote for Tucker to be team leader. Felix sarcastically compares this to the Hindenburg incident, which ended in complete disaster.
224	5	"Training Daze"	June 2, 2014
The Reds, Blues and their squad are about to begin their training, with the main objective being to apprehend Felix, who if caught will give the go ahead to Kimball to let the team rescue the captured Reds and Blues. The team fails again and again miserably and embarrassingly as other New Republic soldiers are watching and laughing at their failures. Tucker grows frustrated and confronts Felix about why he does not lighten up and allow them to win. Felix tells them that Tucker and the others will die if they attempt to rescue the captured Reds and Blues now. Kimball eventually arrives and breaks up the argument. Felix tells Tucker before leaving that while he may not care about losing people, Tucker does. Kimball then approaches Tucker with some likely bad news.
225	6	"Reflections"	June 9, 2014
Tucker and Kimball privately talk about the civil war and Felix's involvement. Kimball reveals Felix was involved before she became an officer, and that she's the fourth leader of the New Republic; her predecessors were all killed. Tucker asks Kimball about Felix's loyalty as a mercenary, and Kimball answers Felix has a common enemy with the New Republic; Locus. Kimball explains that Felix and Locus were once partners in the UNSC during the Great War, and were always competitive, but willing to work together to survive. After the war, neither one could stand civilian life, and became mercenaries, hired by the New Republic and FAC respectively to fight in their civil war. Kimball reminds Tucker that everyone has their own reasons for being in the civil war, and that the five-day limit rescuing the captives is almost up. Meanwhile, Grif gathers Bitters, Smith, Jensen and Palomo for an emergency, believing someone ate his secret food stash. When he finds out it was Bitters, he scolds him and accidentally calls Mathews, who was passing by, Simmons. Witnessing this, Simmons thinks that Grif being in a position of power, and under a lot of stress, is becoming more like Sarge, horrifying Grif. Tucker arrives and tells them they are leaving the base.
226	7	"Self Assessment"	June 16, 2014
At the New Republic HQ, Tucker informs Caboose, Grif and Simmons that they are leaving to rescue the captured Reds and Blues. Tucker tells the guys that they are going alone without the help of their squad, fearing they might get killed. The guys have concerns, but Tucker reminds them of the past adventures they went through and managed to survive them by just winging it. Tucker already has the data he took from the FAC from Kimball's office that he and the guys will follow to the FAC compound where the captured Reds and Blues are. The guys eventually agree, steal two warthogs and leave the Rebel Base. Felix, Kimball, Bitters, Smith, Palomo and Jensen find a recording of the Reds and Blues stating they have already left. The Reds and Blues stop at a gas station to refuel their warthogs, but the gas station seems abandoned. When the guys hear a noise, they investigate and discover a group of silver soldiers conversing. The mysterious squad, apparently working for Locus, are contacted by him to report back to the compound, as the captured Reds and Blues will be requiring an escort. Thinking that the captured Reds and Blues are about to be moved again, the guys quickly head for the FAC compound.
227	8	"Thin Ice"	June 23, 2014
At the New Republic HQ, Smith, Bitters, Palomo and Jensen talk about the Reds and Blues leaving them behind; Smith says Kimball has denied a search and rescue mission; Bitters believes that the guys never really cared about them; Palomo believes they'll come back. Felix arrives, saying that they shouldn't be too hard on the Reds and Blues, though he intends to beat them up when he finds them. Caboose, Tucker, Grif and Simmons have arrived at the FAC base where the captured Reds and Blues are held. Because the base is in a snowy environment, Caboose suggests they melt their way in. Tucker uses his plasma sword to create an entrance into the base, but the group falls into a tunnel, alerting a Fed, who is killed by Tucker. Simmons, looking at the data, notes an open space between them and the detention area, before the Feds return to their posts from a lunch break. Caboose causes a distraction by sabotaging the base's sewage pipe, which leaks into the barracks. The Reds and Blues attempt to break into the detention area, but the doors open; they see Sarge, Donut, Wash and Lopez apparently breaking out. The now reunited Reds and Blues become confused when they learn that they were supposed to save each other.
228	9	"The Federal Army of Chorus"	July 7, 2014
A few weeks earlier, at Crash Site Bravo, after Sarge, Donut and Wash were captured by the FAC. Locus reminds Wash of his offer of surrender, before Wash falls unconscious. At a FAC base, Sarge, Donut and Wash are approached by an apologetic high-ranking officer, who returns their weapons. Wash, angry about the situation, holds the officer at gunpoint but the officer faints. Later, the officer introduces himself as General Donald Doyle, who claims the New Republic isn't looking to free Chorus, but to dominate it; despite being cut off from the UNSC, the FAC kept the peace, until the New Republic emerged with acts of terrorism. Doyle claims he ordered Locus to bring the Reds and Blues to him but admits that he should have been more specific; he has military training, being a personal secretary to a brigadier general. The FAC's previous military leaders either left or were killed, leaving him in charge. Doyle says if the Reds and Blues help defeat the "terrorists" and rescue their friends, they'll be free to leave Chorus. The guys reluctantly agree, and find Lopez has been repaired. When Wash asks about Freckles, Locus arrives and reveals Mantis had to be destroyed due to malfunctioning; but gives Wash Freckles memory chip. Locus explains he intended to apprehend the Reds and Blues, before Felix and the New Republic interfered. The guys are soon informed by Doctor Emily Grey, who performed surgery on Wash, that they'll be sent on a mission after Wash has a check-up with her. The guys are uneasy about their situation, but Wash says that they'll have to go along for now and hopes that the others aren't in too deep.
229	10	"Cloak and Dagger"	July 14, 2014
Continuing from Thin Ice, the now reunited Reds and Blues discuss the New Republic and the FAC. Wash suggests getting Doyle and Kimball to meet and come to an understanding; Simmons points out that the FAC base's alarm isn't sounding off anymore. When they head outside, a battle has apparently taken place, with no soldiers present. When a FAC soldier radios that they're under attack, Sarge, Donut and Lopez take a rocket warthog to set a perimeter. The soldier runs to Sarge, claiming the New Republic isn't attacking, but disintegrates before he could reveal who is. The FAC force have been massacred, save for Doctor Grey. After escaping an exploding warthog, the Reds and Blues are held at gunpoint by Locus and forces, revealing they committed the massacre. Felix arrives, saving Wash from Locus' sniper shot; before revealing he, Locus and their mercenaries both answer to an employer "Control"; their employer had their focus on Chorus, and had Felix and Locus infiltrate the New Republic and FAC respectively, to sabotage any attempts at peace and ensure their war kept going; their end goal is for both sides to wipe each other out, and avoid suspicion from the UNSC. They also wanted the Reds and Blues to join both sides to hasten the end of the war. However, a female member of Locus' squad turns on them. In the ensuing firefight, she's stabbed in the leg by Felix, before using "future" cube to teleport herself, the Reds, Blues and Doctor Grey to safety. Teleported to a forest, she reveals herself to be Carolina, accompanied by Church as a holographic A.I. Tucker, angry at Church for leaving them when their ship charges him down, only to fall right through him.
230	11	"Long Time No See"	July 21, 2014
A few weeks before Cloak and Dagger, Church and Carolina infiltrate a mercenary-controlled munitions plant, recovering data on stolen Freelancer equipment. When escape is blocked by enemy soldiers, Church - with help from A.I. memory fragments of Delta, Theta, Gamma, Eta, Iota, Sigma, and Omega - helps Carolina dispatch the soldiers and escape, but her helmet is damaged in the fight. At a safe distance, Carolina looks through schematics of advanced prototype weapons, apparently sought after by the mercenaries and their employer "Control". Church shows Carolina a clip he intercepted from a conversation between Locus and Control; Control is concerned about his property loss following a raid on a FAC outpost, though Locus says he eliminated the leader of the outpost; Felix joins the conversation, pointing out that the Reds and Blues are more of a handful than being assets in their plans. Felix states that if the Reds and Blues reunite, their operation may be exposed. Locus asks what they should do in that case, to which Control replies that they kill the Reds and Blues. Church convinces Carolina to put a hold on their search for stolen equipment to save the Reds and Blues, and puts up a schematic of a "future" cube they could use to get to the Reds and Blues in time. Donning a stolen helmet to replace her damaged one, Carolina prepares to rescue her friends.
231	12	"The Reunion"	July 28, 2014
Picking up after their reunion, Doctor Grey tends to Carolina's leg wound. Carolina and Church tell the guys they were investigating the mercenaries selling Project Freelancer equipment. They reveal the mercenaries are mass producing Project Freelancer weapons and equipment, improving them to the point where some don't need A.I. assistance. Simmons says the UNSC confiscated the equipment after Project Freelancer's defeat, but Carolina reveals it was put on their ship; which conveniently crash-landed on a war-torn planet in need of supplies, implying the ship sabotaged the ship to crash on Chorus (A flashback shows Simmons updating the ship's computer that may have caused the crash, but he and the other Reds and Blues are not responsible). Tucker suggests warning the FAC and New Republic about the mercenaries' plans. With Locus and Felix infiltrating both sides, and watching their leaders closely, Carolina says that they can't do so yet, as the mercenaries have different contingency plans to finish what they've started. Elsewhere, Locus and Felix argue; Felix blames Locus for not realizing Carolina infiltrated his squad; Locus blaming Felix for letting his ego get in the way. Control, intending to chastise their failure, suggests taking their chance with the Reds and Blues missing; ordering them to report back to their respective sides about the Reds and Blues' "deaths"; making them martyrs for a final confrontation in the Civil War.
232	13	"Catch Up, No Mustard"	August 11, 2014
At the Reds and Blues' camp, Carolina tries to convince Grif to give up his laser rifle so she can look at it, who fears he won't see it again like his "Grif Shot" (The Meta's old weapon). Church temporarily possesses Grif into giving the rifle to Carolina. Church and Carolina leave to look at the rifle, leaving the Reds and Blues to reconnect, but they too leave except Caboose and Wash when Caboose asks Wash about Freckles. Wash, trying to make things easy, gives Caboose Freckles' memory chip and reveals that it's all that is left of Freckles. Wash is surprised to see Caboose still happy to see Freckles again, which relieves Wash. Grif eventually gets his laser rifle back from Carolina and accidentally shoots at her. Doctor Grey says that the rifle and other weapons and equipment like it are actually based on alien technology, which means that the mercenaries are having the ancient alien weapons and equipment reversed-engineered. In order to find out who had the weapons and equipment on the Reds and Blues' crashed ship and are manufacturing more of them on Chorus, Carolina suggests that they split into two teams to search both halves of the crashed ship: one team going back to Crash Site Bravo, and the other team going to Crash Site Alpha.
233	14	"Crash Site Crashers"	August 18, 2014
At the New Republic HQ, Felix attempts to comfort Kimball over the Reds and Blues "deaths" and convinces her to lead the Rebels against FAC at the planet capital Armonia, where they are holding a rally for a final push. Meanwhile, the Reds and Blues head for the two halves of their crashed ship to find the manifest: the Reds head back to Crash Site Bravo; the Blues with Church and Carolina go to Crash Site Alpha. Grif and Simmons reminisce about their time with the Rebels, while Sarge and Donut download the manifest. The Blues, Church and Carolina find an old alien ship that had also crash landed on Chorus (explaining how the mercenaries got alien weapons). The team eventually finds a computer and begins downloading the manifest. Control's mercenaries, somehow aware of this, attempt to kill the team by boxing them in. Seeing them as sitting ducks, Tucker takes the drive out prematurely, forcing Carolina to teleport them back to their camp. Church becomes furious with Tucker over losing their chance, but the Reds return with a copy of the manifest. Suddenly a mercenary, having teleported back with the Blues, tries to assassinate Caboose but is knocked out by Carolina. This causes Carolina's right leg to be re-injured, and lose blood while the rest restrain the mercenary.
234	15	"Accentuate and Interrogative"	August 25, 2014
At their camp, Tucker tells Wash about his choices, and negative results; Wash tells him that there is no right or wrong answer, and he has to do what he thinks is best. Wash comments on Tucker becoming a better soldier. Simmons asks Wash to try to calm Carolina down while she unsuccessfully interrogates the captured mercenary. Church has problems accessing the crashed ship's manifest after it is locked. Doctor Grey uses surgical equipment to torture the mercenary for information, terrifying the Reds and Blues as they hear his screams; the mercenary give up coordinates to a nearby jammer on a coast blocking radio contact to Armonia, and that the tower at Crash Site Alpha is an alien tractor beam they ysed to bring down ships to Chorus before raiding them for weapons and supplies; the Reds and Blues' ship tried to jump to slipspace, change course and power down at the same time, causing the ship to split into two (meaning their previous shenanigans on the ship inadvertently saved their lives). The prisoner is killed when more mercenaries attack the camp, forcing the Reds and Blues to retreat via future cubes. Teleported to the abandoned gas station, they wonder how the mercenaries keep finding them, Wash and realizes that Freckles' memory chip is also a tracking device.
235	16	"Out of the Frying Pan"	September 1, 2014
At concurrent times at their respective headquarters, Doyle and Kimball give the FAC and New Republic speeches about the impending final conflict for Chorus. Locus informs Doyle that Felix has been sent on a mission, and Locus is going to find him. Doyle panics, wanting Locus to stay by his side; Locus assures Doyle he'll return to "take care" of him after he's done. At the abandoned gas station, Church debugs Freckles' memory chip so that they can't be tracked. Tensions boil over when Tucker and Church as they argue over what they've done to each other ever since Church and Carolina came back. When Wash and Carolina leave to patrol the perimeter, Tucker asks Caboose why he's not angry at Church for leaving them behind. Caboose gives a speech about how meaningless holding onto anger is, and that everyone makes mistakes even when they mean well, before telling Tucker to get over his issues with Church. Tucker makes amends with Church, both agreeing they made mistakes. Church says he's still getting used to the others being more active; in Blood Gulch, everyone else goofed around while Church did all the important things. Tucker affirms that they can do things together now. Suddenly the Reds and Blues' radios are hacked into by Felix, who offers them a one-time only deal: a one-way first-class flight off of Chorus.
236	17	"Multiple Choice"	September 15, 2014
Locus and Felix, tell the Reds and Blues the FAC and New Republic are converging at Armonia, and the ensuing battle will leave no survivors. Believing the Reds and Blues failed in saving Chorus, Locus and Felix state that Control is offering them a deal: if they return to Crash Site Bravo, a ship waiting will take them off Chorus. The Reds and Blues are unconvinced, but Locus shows them a transport leaving the fuel station. The mercenaries state if the Reds and Blues leave, they must never reveal what happened on Chorus, as Control will know if they say anything. Locus says they have an hour to accept the deal, and if they refuse, they will be killed. The New Republic infiltrates Armonia as Palomo, Smith, Bitters and Jensen lead rebels into the city, being secretly watched by cloaked mercenaries, with orders to leave no survivors. Back at the gas station, Church states they have three options: "Option A": lay low to gather intel on Control and the Mercenaries, risking the FAC and the New Republic to destroy each other. "Option B": they take the deal. "Option C": they shut down the jammer, and expose the mercenaries, risking their lives; and that if they can convince both sides they are telling the truth. Wash proposes a fourth option: he, Church and Carolina do "Option A" while the Reds and Blues do "Option B." The Reds and Blues are reluctant to leave Chorus behind, but Doctor Grey tells them the war is not their responsibility. Back at Armonia, Kimball and New Republic forces move further into the capital, but they are soon surrounded by FAC forces. Kimball and her team are cornered by a FAC squad led by Doyle himself.
237	18	"Fed vs. New"	September 22, 2014
At the radio jammer, Locus receives a report that the Reds and Blues haven't arrived at Crash Site Bravo. Suspicious Felix, asks Locus how many mercenaries are with them; Locus answers "four" with the rest in Armonia. Felix exposes the fifth "mercenary" as a disguised Carolina. Wash tries to get the jump on Felix, caught by Locus. Holding Wash and Carolina captive, Locus and Felix send their men after the Reds and Blues when Caboose accidentally fires his assault rifle. Wash tells Locus and Felix that they forgot to take in account the genius (Doctor Grey) and the dog (Freckles); in the cave, two mercenaries are caught off guard by Caboose's assault rifle, controlled by Freckles. The Reds and Blues take out the remaining mercenaries while Wash and Carolina fight Locus and Felix. Locus knocks Carolina out, fighting Wash, while Felix then takes on Tucker. In Armonia, Kimball and Doyle face off, accusing each other of killing the Reds and Blues. To instigate the battle, a mercenary kills one of the Rebels in Kimball's squad. At the radio jammer, Wash searches for a cloaked Locus, arguing against his "soldier" ideology, prompting Locus to fight him. Tucker faces Felix, who incapacitates the Reds and Caboose with a detonator, and stabs Tucker. Felix gloats about how he and Locus have played both factions for years. However, Tucker reveals Church, as an AI, recorded Felix's confession on his helmet cam, sending it to the FAC and New Republic. The mercenaries flee, while Tucker passes out, and Tucker and Kimball order their armies to stand down.
238	19	"You Know Who We Are"	September 29, 2014
At the New Republic HQ, after Tucker recovers from his injuries, Palomo tells a dramatic story of how he looked after Tucker, before Tucker himself interrupts. Kimball and Doyle agree to a truce, and discuss moving the New Republic to Armonia, though Doyle is reluctant. Near the cavern lake, Delta helps Church decrypt the crashed ship's manifest, and reveals to Carolina that Charon Industries - a large corporation specializing in cryogenics, technology, and weaponry - owned many of the equipment on the ship. It's explained that Project Freelancer stole equipment from Charon’s private security force, known to the Freelancers as the Resistance - also known as "The Insurrection" - and the company and UNSC have been working closely together. The Church demands to speak to Dr. Grey to get all known radio frequencies used by the captured mercenaries.Meanwhile, Control reprimands Locus and Felix for their failure, deciding they will go to war against the Reds, Blues and the Chorus armies. However, the Reds and Blues interrupt their transmission, revealing Control’s true identity: Malcom Hargrove, CEO of Charon Industries and the Chairman of the UNSC Oversight Subcommittee. The Reds and Blues confidently inform Hargove and the mercenaries that they and Chorus' armies will join forces, accepting Hargove's declaration. In a post-credits scene, Hargrovee asks a recovered F.I.L.S.S. to verify Locus' delivery of a crate. F.I.L.S.S. unhappily answers that the crate from the ship was in fact delivered, to Hargrove's satisfaction; revealing the crate encased the armor of Agent Maine, the Meta.

==== Season 13 (2015) ====
It's all-out war as the Reds and Blues lead the people of Chorus against a mercenary army led by Hargrove, Felix and Locus.

No. Overall	No. in Season	Title	Original release date
239	1	"Prologue"	April 1, 2015
A UNSC ship called the Tartarus stumbles upon a lone Pelican, and the ship's crew try to communicate with it. After the Pelican sends flashes of light to signify help, the crew on the Tartarus allow the ship to land in their docking bay, so they can assist it. When the crew approach the Pelican, weapons at the ready, they discover the ship's "sole" passenger: Felix. Felix quickly gets along with the Tartarus' crew, and asks them about their current situation. The crew explain that they're transporting criminals for the UNSC, and the ship's captain, Mayers, jokes that nobody gives a "rat's ass" about them. Felix, however, says that he's interested and proceeds to attack the crew members, causing Mayers to activate the ship's alarm. Unfortunately, Locus, accompanied by other mercenaries, de-cloak from the Pelican and raid the ship. After killing all of the ship's crew, along with their Captain, Locus and Felix make their way to the intercom, and inform the prisoners of their war situation on Chorus. Locus and Felix then explain that they are looking for people to recruit in their ranks and, in exchange, will get a large profit from it. Felix asks that if anyone is interested, to grasp their cell bars in solidarity. While some prisoners agree to join them, others refuse. Regardless, Felix opens the cells' airblock doors, purging several prisoners out into deep space. Felix and Locus remain unharmed with the use of their grav boots. After Felix closes the doors, Locus congratulates the remaining prisoners on being "hired". Upon returning to the ship's main control bridge, a mercenary informs Locus and Felix of a prisoner, who saved himself from being purged by tying his bedsheets to his cell bars, wishing to speak with them. Locus and Felix agree to see the said prisoner, which turns out to be Aiden Price, the former Counselor of Project Freelancer. The Counselor tells Locus and Felix that he knows specific details about the Freelancers that they will find useful, such as Wash and Carolina's weaknesses. Skeptical at first, Locus and Felix agree to have Price join their ranks and the latter leads them to another prisoner that has history with Project Freelancer; a prisoner that he believes will be of good use. Meanwhile, at an unknown location on Chorus, Grif asks Caboose what he is doing, in which the latter expresses his feeling of something bad about to happen.
240	2	"Capital Assets"	April 6, 2015
In Downtown Armonia, Grif is greeted by several Feds and Rebels, much to his annoyance. He then encounters Matthews, who thanks him for saving the armies back at Radio Jammer Station 1C, for the 57th time, angering Grif. Grif then asks Matthews about Kimball's whereabouts, in which the latter tells him that she's at the Armory. Grif makes his way there. They find Simmons, Lopez, and Donut at the armory; Simmons and Donut argue with a Fed soldier regarding his heavy machine gun turret, as well as his armor color. Grif approaches them and asks them about Kimball's whereabouts. Donut explains that she was last seen in the training room, so Grif takes off to the training room, leaving Donut, Simmons and Lopez to continue arguing with the heavily armed soldier. At the Armonia Training Facility, Wash instructs newly promoted lieutenant Palomo, Smith, Bitters and Jensen during a target practice session. Grif interrupts the training, and asks Wash where Kimball is. Wash, in turn, brings up Grif's absence during training, and when the latter remorselessly admits that he wasn't present, Wash punishes the lieutenants for Grif's actions. Regardless, Wash informs Grif that Kimball is in a meeting with Doyle at the War Room, causing Grif to rush over there. At the War Room, Kimball and Doyle argue over the Feds' overuse of ammunition, due to them preferring to use Assault Rifles over DMRs. Grif interrupts them and complains about why he isn't allowed to have second helpings in the mess hall. Doyle explains to him that it is because since the two armies have joined forces, there have been current food shortages, but this quickly leads into an argument between him and Kimball. Grif continues to try to explain his case, but Kimball, annoyed, forces Grif out and places him on dish duty. After the two calm down, Doyle informs Kimball of their men's most recent assault. At Charon Research Complex 2C, it is revealed that the Chorus assault force led by Tucker, Sarge, Epsilon Church and Carolina successfully captured the base. Tucker and Sarge taunt the captured mercenaries with a rendition of Queen's Another One Bites the Dust. Meanwhile, Carolina and Epsilon revert their focus on the intel regarding Freelancer equipment, and Church tells them to report back to their accompanying Feds and Rebels. When the two do so, Church and Carolina ponder over an alien-like structure nearby, wondering what other things Charon have been studying on Chorus.
241	3	"What's Yours is Ours"	April 13, 2015
At Charon Research Complex 2C, a Fed approaches Carolina and Epsilon and informs them of their recovery of a domed energy shield. Carolina applauds the Fed and suggests they begin running some tests with it. Epsilon, however, states that they should instead focus on the floating tower, in which the Fed clarifies that it is actually a temple created by ancient aliens. Surprised by this, Epsilon and Carolina question the Fed on the temple, in which the latter explains that many of Chorus' inhabitants see these alien-structures as commonplace, with them being used as tourist attractions. After Carolina tells the Fed to go secure the Freelancer equipment, Epsilon expresses his concerns about the temple despite how the residents of Chorus see it. Carolina then proposes they get help from someone who is an expert on the planet's alien technology: Dr. Grey. Dr. Grey is teleported to the research complex and explains, rather quickly, that the temple emerged from the ground after the UNSC pulled out but hasn't shown any activity since. After Tucker and Sarge enter the scene, Carolina orders Dr. Grey to study Charon's research while she and Epsilon take care of some armor upgrades. After they leave, Grif and Simmons suddenly teleport to the complex, with Tucker and Sarge wondering what took them so long to arrive. They explain that they had to leave Donut and Lopez in charge of the armory, with Lopez speaking to the troops and Donut incorrectly translating for him. After Grif grabs the pirates' weapons collected by Sarge and Tucker's team with a teleportation grenade, Dr. Grey announces her discovery over the intercom and asks for the Blood Gulch Crew to come see her. Inside the compound, Dr. Grey reveals to the Reds and Blues that Charon have been trying to activate many of the alien temples, primarily the one near the complex. She also states that she is going to find out what the nearby temple does and asks for volunteers to join her. Sarge and Tucker agree to accompany her, but Grey recommends that a four-man team would be ideal, prompting Epsilon to suggest a particular person: Caboose. Caboose is teleported to the complex and is overjoyed about going on the "field trip", running around the entire compound. Tucker, unfortunately, is less than cheerful.
242	4	"Tourist Trap"	April 20, 2015
Tucker, Caboose, Sarge and Grey arrive at a Charon excavation site located near the entrance of the floating temple. The group approaches the site to find it deserted. Grey has Tucker, Caboose and Sarge keep watch while she investigates the temple. Caboose and Sarge stand watch on top of the site's base, while Tucker is with Grey as she is translating ancient alien language. When Tucker pulls out his plasma sword, a holographic projection lights up with a symbol over the door. Tucker carefully approaches it and when a projection of an alien suddenly appears, he swings his sword at it in shock and unintentionally activates the dormant temple, which gives off a bright purple light that can be seen by the Chorus soldiers at the captured Charon complex. While this has been going on, Grif and Simmons had returned to Armonia with the captured weapons. As Grif leaves to continue his laziness, he is confronted by the lieutenants and a mob of Chorus soldiers, who tell Grif that since he has been absent from training, Wash has been making them run an abundance of laps. Grif tries to leave but the mob attacks and beat him up. Meanwhile, Donut is playing with an old alien rifle that was with the captured weapons in the armory with Simmons looking on. As the events of the temple happened, the rifle instantly activates and starts randomly shooting, causing destruction and chaos in the armory. Lopez arrives shortly after the destruction ends, and says he is not cleaning the mess up. Back at the alien temple, Tucker, Caboose, Sarge and Grey stand in awe in front of a huge arsenal of alien weapons and vehicles. As they try to make sense of what happened, a voice is heard speaking in an alien language. Thinking that the alien is trying to talk to them, Tucker says "What's up" to it, but the temple deactivates and the alien weapons and vehicles disappear. After Tucker receives a beating from Sarge, Grey reveals to Tucker that he has just activated technology that had been dormant for many millennia. A new projection lights up, this time showing a map of Chorus with a specific location being highlighted.
243	5	"No Fighting in the War Room"	May 4, 2015
Inside a tractor beam tower at Crash Site Alpha, the Counselor assures Felix and Locus that the prisoner they picked up, who calls himself Sharkface, will be useful to them. Suddenly, the tower shuts down and a space pirate informs Felix and Locus that all of their weapons and equipment have suddenly exploded. Just then, a red light appears behind the two mercenaries. Meanwhile, Doyle, Kimball, Wash and the Reds contact the group at Charon Research Complex 2C, who inform them of the activation of the alien tower. Grey reveals that all of the alien weapons and temples on Chorus weren't broken, they were just deactivated. Confused about how they did it, Tucker explains how his quest with the Alien (from Season 3 of The Blood Gulch Chronicles) and the revelation of his sword being a key caused the tower to activate, and ends his story by showing a picture of Junior on a fifth grade basketball team, confusing Doyle. After Wash gets everyone back on track, Carolina points out that because their Charon weaponry exploded, the space pirates most likely had the same experience with their weapons, giving them the advantage in numbers and weaponry. Kimball then states that while they've had small victories in the past few weeks, they still can't make contact with the UNSC due to the pirates' tractor beams and radio jammers. As a result, Kimball suggests they take down the tractor beams at Crash Site Alpha, but Wash and Doyle explain that the beams will be heavily guarded and won't be taken down easily. Regardless, Kimball argues that they must make some kind of move now while the pirates are down, prompting Tucker to bring up the map that the tower revealed. Tucker suggests they follow the coordinates and investigate where it leads and what is there but Kimball argues against it. Wash adds that the pirates will be able to track and follow them there, but Epsilon and Carolina state that they can't let whatever the coordinates lead to fall into Charon's hand. As a result, Doyle proposes they divide and conquer, with the Blues, Dr. Grey and Carolina following the coordinates and Kimball leading an attack with the Reds, Wash and the Chorus armies to Crash Site Alpha. All the while, Doyle, Donut and Lopez will stay and guard Armonia. Back at Crash Site Alpha, a space pirate informs Felix and Locus of the destruction of all their weapons and equipment, with Locus ordering the pirate to send in the scientists in response. Another pirate then radios the two and informs them about a communications request from Control. Felix tells the pirate to tell Control that they'll call right back, revealing Felix and Locus staring at a map similar to the one at the alien temple, showing the same coordinates.
244	6	"Along Came a Spider"	May 11, 2015
At Armonia, the Chorus armies prepare for their assault on Crash Site Alpha. Kimball approaches two Feds and orders them to line up their warthog with the others, but the two tell her that she must fill out a vehicle request form for them to do so. Wash steps in and reiterates Kimball's exact orders to the Feds, which the two respectfully follow without question. As Kimball expresses her dislike for the Feds Wash advises that she should have faith in them and they may do the same to her. Suddenly, Jensen passes by in a Warthog and crashes it, somehow causing a large pile up of vehicles (She was going five miles per hour). Meanwhile, the Blues, Dr. Grey and Carolina make a pit stop at an uncharted area on Chorus in order to refuel their warthogs. Carolina suggests that she and Church test out their enhancements while they wait, but Church advises her to loosen up, not wanting her to outwork herself. After the others finish refueling, Tucker makes a sexual joke and says his signature "Bow chicka bow wow!" catchphrase, but is interrupted by Carolina, who says it too in an attempt to loosen up. This, unfortunately, only causes the situation to grow awkward. Meanwhile, Locus and Felix are seen in the depths of a jungle, preparing to contact Hargrove. Upon calling him, Hargrove, while aboard the Staff of Charon, expresses his anger over the destruction of their modified weaponry and chastises the two mercenaries for their inability to eliminate the Blood Gulch Crew and Chorus armies, despite all of the resources he's provided them. So, as a way of motivating the two, Hargrove reveals what he refers to as, "the future of modern warfare": the Meta's armor. Hargrove describes the modifications he's made to the armor, with it now being able to support all of the attained Freelancer enhancements at once. However, he adds that running multiple enhancements would be too taxing for one individual, so Felix suggests they capture Epsilon. Hargrove explains that Epsilon is too old to run the suit and that he is trying to acquire an A.I. through legitimate means, though the late Director Church's actions have made this extremely difficult. Regardless, Hargrove makes a deal with Locus and Felix: if the two can accomplish their mission before the armor is completed, Charon will lend them the suit for their own personal use. But if they fail, Hargrove will find another candidate for the suit of armor to complete what the two mercenaries could not, as well as tie up any loose ends (possibly killing Locus and Felix). Locus and Felix agree to Hargrove's terms and end their transmission with him. Soon after, the two mercenaries regroup with the other space pirates, having arrived at the location of the map's coordinates.
245	7	"Locus of Control"	May 18, 2015
The space pirates arrive at the alien installation displayed on the map. Locus and Felix meet one of their scientists, who explains that the device they found there is some sort of gateway. He also states that there seems to be a sort of strong energy coming from the Beam. When asked if it could be weaponized, the scientist explains that it can not, for its power could be too great. Nearby texts reveal that the gateway will only allow someone who is judged to be a "true warrior" through. When the scientist is unable to explain the consequences for failing, Felix pushes one of his soldiers into the gateway to test it out. Meanwhile, Sharkface is approached by the Counselor while armoring up for his mission: to kill Agents Washington and Carolina. The Counselor attempts to evaluate his psychology and go over the mission briefing, but Sharkface is dismissive of him. But, he reveals that he has had a past encounter with the two Agents stating that they 'dropped a building' on him, 'killing all his friends'. He then asks the Counselor how he ended up on the Tartarus, and the latter reluctantly reveals that he was betrayed by people he trusted, and upon further prodding, admits that he would kill them if it would allow him to repair his life. Back at the alien installation, the soldier returns from the gateway and claims to have had visions of "everyone he ever wronged". The scientist checks him over and states that he is physically healthy, despite his scares. Felix is annoyed at the potential visions he would experience, stating that meeting everyone he ever wronged would take weeks. However, Locus decides to personally attempt the test since the group is short on time. Reluctantly, Felix agrees and goes with him, telling him not to 'cry if he loses'. In the gateway, Locus' equipment malfunctions. While attempting to contact Felix, he is questioned by an ominous voice, questioning who he is. Before he could respond, he is immediately ambushed by a group of UNSC soldiers who believe he is a monster and cannot understand his attempts to communicate. The group's commander attempts to interrogate Locus, to no avail. Suddenly, much to Locus' surprise, Felix and another Locus appear with the commander. Locus recognizes the event from back during the Great War when he and Felix served in the UNSC. While the illusory Locus believes the "monster" is scared and could be convinced to surrender, the illusory Felix states that they are short on time and cannot afford to take prisoners. The commander agrees with Felix and sends him and the illusory Locus to dispose of the real Locus in a secure location. When the illusory Locus further protests, the commander angrily tells him that on the battlefield, he is nothing more than a suit of armor and a gun and must follow orders. This angers the real Locus, who points his gun at the commander and causes the UNSC troops to shoot him. Locus returns to reality, where Felix is waiting for him; he reveals that he also experienced things straight out of his nightmares. Felix and Locus decide that they cannot use the gateway, order their troops to prepare for 'Plan B', and leave the area. However, Locus ponders on his recent encounter. After some time has passed, the Blues, Dr. Grey and Carolina arrive.
246	8	"Test Your Might"	May 25, 2015
The Reds, Wash and the Chorus armies arrive at the Desert Refueling Station in order to refuel their vehicles. Wash approaches the Reds and updates them on the status of the Blues, Dr. Grey and Carolina detailing their discovery of a large jungle temple emitting energy into the sky. Wash then expresses his admiration for the Reds for their decision to fight with the Chorus armies, and recollects on their past experiences together. Seeing through his sentimentality, Grif and Simmons realize that Wash believes they are going to die on the mission, but Wash denies this. Wash then asks what unit they're in, in which Sarge states that he's volunteered them for the front lines, which shocks Grif and Simmons. Wash suggests that they look on the bright side, but miserably fails to follow up on what the bright side is. Meanwhile, at the jungle temple, Dr. Grey informs the Blues and Carolina the temple's rules after deciphering them. Tucker suggests that he fits the bill of being a true warrior simply because he possesses the sword. The others go along with it and allow Tucker to enter. However, Tucker is quickly forced out after entry and tells the others that he saw multiple illusions of Felix and Locus, while on the other side, who all quickly overwhelmed him. As a result, Carolina decides to enter the portal herself. Upon entry, Carolina immediately loses contact with Epsilon and is soon spoken to by an alien voice, the same that spoke with Locus before, who questions her on who she is. Carolina states that she is his true warrior but an illusion of Tex appears and states otherwise, shocking Carolina. Suddenly, the rest of the Freelancers appear behind Carolina. After Carolina returns from the portal, Epsilon, having only seen static after entering, questions her on what she saw, but Carolina refuses to discuss it. As a result, the group decide to send Caboose through, believing his strength and "empty head" may correspond with the instructions. After Caboose enters the portal he is spoken to by the alien voice, who quickly becomes amazed at the state of Caboose's mind lacking any fear, self-doubt, or negativity. In addition, the alien voice expresses his surprise of Caboose's physical strength, stating that his action of increasing the gravity had no effect on Caboose. Due to this, the alien reveals himself to Caboose and proclaims him to be a true warrior. Upon exiting the portal, Caboose reveals the alien to the others, which he named Santa. Santa greets the group and explains that he is actually an A.I. construct left on Chorus by his Creators to ensure that their relics are passed down to those they deem worthy. While the group is dumbfounded at the fact that the A.I. is named Santa, Santa bows down to the noble warriors.
247	9	"You Better Watch Out"	June 8, 2015
As Kimball and the Chorus force make their way to Crash Site Alpha, one of her soldiers informs her about the away team's discovery of Santa. Upon hearing this news, Kimball and the entire force halt in their tracks. At the Jungle Temple, Santa explains to the Away Team about his creators and the treasures they've scattered throughout the galaxy, with Chorus containing some of the most valuable. He states that Tucker activated the “Temple of Arms” (which activates all alien weapons on Chorus) back at the excavation site, prompting Tucker to ask why he deactivated it afterward. In response, Santa reveals that not long ago a group of meddlers gained partial control of the tractor beams and used them to manipulate the planet’s gravitational field. This reveals that Locus, Felix, and their band of Space Pirates were truly responsible for the Red's and Blue's shipwreck from Season 11. He then adds that he deactivated the Temple of Arms because Tucker did not respond in the voice of his people and needed to bring him to the Jungle Temple due to protocol for further testing. Dr. Grey then questions why he tested them if Tucker already had a key, in which Santa reveals that the key of Chorus, located in a temple in the east mountains had not yet been obtained and had to make sure that the presence of two keys was not an error. Carolina and Epsilon then ask Santa about the other temples on Chorus. Upon listing them out that include Weather Manipulation, Bountiful Harvest, Interior Decorating and Procreation (increasing one's sexual drive), Santa describes the Temple of Communication, which has the power to transfer a signal to any desired communication device in the galaxy and is capable of ripping through the Space Pirates' radio jammers "without question". This excites the group, now knowing they can radio for help. Because of this, the group decide to cease Kimball’s assault and head for the Temple of Communication. Before they leave, Santa informs them of the 'Purge', which has the ability to exterminate all sentient life on Chorus upon activation by a key in case the Chorus inhabitants are deemed not worthy of receiving his Creator's gifts. After Epsilon asks for its location Santa displays the coordinates for him and reveals that he updates all of the temples with these maps. Unfortunately, Church gets a bad feeling, and a band of Space Pirates, after listening in on their conversation, ambush the group. Luckily, Carolina activates her Domed Energy Shield and saves her teammates, before the pirates could shoot them down. Sharkface then appears and orders his men, once the shield fails, to kill everyone except Carolina, so that he can kill her himself. He then leaves for the east mountains to get the key, but not before thanking them for the information and revealing that the space pirates are waiting for their friends at Alpha. Meanwhile, at Alpha, the Reds and Chorus force arrives and begin their assault on the space pirates. However, the Tartarus soon emerges from the sky and hovers over them, with countless Space Pirates jumping out of it, quickly outnumbering them. Felix then briefly radios Kimball, reminding her he was her right-hand man and knew about this attack, much to her anger. Before Kimball could scold Felix, he mutes her. Immediately after, Sharkface contacts Locus and Felix and informs them about the Purge and the location of the key that can activate it, stating that he is on his way there now. Felix decides to go after it with Sharkface while Locus stays at Alpha. Before leaving, Felix tells Locus to kill Kimball quick if he gets the chance, since she and Felix were friends after all. Back in Armonia, Doyle receives a distress call from Kimball, who informs him of the pirates' ambush and demands that he send reinforcements to assist them at Alpha. Doyle then receives another call, this one from Carolina, informing him to instead send a squad towards the east mountains in order to attain a key, before the pirates get there first and "end the world". Confused, Doyle asks Carolina to elaborate.
248	10	"Temple of the Key"	June 15, 2015
With the battle raging at Crash Site Alpha, two Feds, one of which is injured, call for a medic. The Rebel Medic rushes over to assist them but quickly becomes confused after the injured Fed explains that his "lap" was shot, as well as his "tummy". As the Reds drive past, Sarge pitches a strategy to overcome the enemy, by creating a slow motion car crash. Not fond of the plan, however, Grif and Simmons suggest they regroup with Wash. Eventually, the assault team are overwhelmed by Charon fire, forcing them to take cover inside the ship. Simmons comes up with a plan to create a large smokescreen by using the ship’s engine in order to escape. The lieutenants agree to help him, though Bitters warns him that sniper fire is coming from out of nowhere in that area, in which Wash states that he’ll take care of it. Meanwhile, at the Jungle Temple, the away team continue to take refuge inside Carolina’s domed energy shield while the space pirates prepare to open fire. Carolina tells Epsilon to prep her Speed Boost but he tells her that it won’t work. With Santa being unable to assist them and the shield running out of power, Dr. Grey orders Freckles to run command “Aimbot” and proceeds to hop through the portal. After the shield lowers, Freckles, in response to Grey’s command, rapidly fires at the four pirates and kills them. After Grey returns from the portal, the team is contacted by friendly forces, who inform them that a Pelican is en route to their position. Confused, Carolina explains that Doyle was supposed to send troops to the east mountains first, in which the soldier assures her that he did. Meanwhile, Felix, accompanied by a few pirates, unites with Sharkface at an East Mountain Range and the two make their way to the Temple of the Key. Felix enters the temple but finds no trace of the key, with Santa telling him that the key has already been claimed. It is then revealed that the recipient of the key is Doyle, who was dropped off by Lopez and Donut via Pelican. Lopez informs Doyle that they’ll have to land farther away from his position because the temple is interfering with their controls, though Doyle doesn’t understand him. Despite this, Doyle is forced to hide after the pirates begin searching for him. The away team finally arrives at the Temple of the Key, where Carolina radios Doyle inquiring about his location. Doyle, unfortunately, gives a vague answer, due to the fact that Felix is searching for him nearby. Suddenly the group encounter Sharkface, who quickly leaves to find Doyle. After Carolina gives chase, Tucker, Caboose, and Grey are attacked by pirates, forcing them to take cover inside a cave. Unexpectedly, the three find Doc inside, who explains that he was sent into another dimension after being caught in Grif’s teleportation cube and expresses joy upon seeing them again. However, Tucker and Caboose admit that they did not realize he was gone and radio the Reds asking if they knew of Doc’s disappearance, though they too did not until remembering Grif teleported him. Angry, Doc begins to laugh maniacally like O'Malley and tackles Tucker as a result.
249	11	"Dish Best Served"	June 22, 2015
Somewhere out in the eastern mountain range, Carolina catches up to a fleeing Sharkface and the two quickly engage in battle. Carolina initially bests Sharkface but the latter gets up and disarms Carolina of her weapons. Meanwhile, at Crash Site Alpha, a Fed and a Rebel fight over a section of cover until the Rebel is killed by a cloaked Locus. Locus is then informed by one of his men that enemy reinforcements are nearby, though Locus shows no sign of worry as he acknowledges his assurance that the Chorus armies will be dead before their help arrives. Suddenly, Washington speaks to Locus via open channel radio and gets him to give away his position by causing him to shoot at his empty helmet, which Wash raises by using his battle rifle. Upon seeing the sniper's vapor trail, the lieutenants fire at Locus and force him to take cover. Jensen then gives Kimball and the Reds the okay to release the smokescreen, which they do, shrouding the battlefield in black smoke. After the Reds kill numerous Space Pirates by executing a slow-motion car crash, they, along with the rest of the assault team, escape Alpha. Wash then radios Locus again and reveals that he knew the latter was watching him while he was with the Federal Army and decided to watch him too. He then adds that he is the real soldier while Locus is simply a killer, before logging off. In response, Locus demands a vehicle. Back at the east mountains, Doc/O'Malley continues to throttle Tucker in maniacal anger while Caboose explains their relationship with Doc to Dr. Grey. After Grey knocks Doc/O'Malley off of Tucker the group is confronted by two pirates. Luckily, Donut and Lopez arrive and kill the pirates. The two then join Tucker and Caboose in finding Doyle, while Grey stays behind to look after Doc. Meanwhile, Carolina and Sharkface continue their brawl, both being equally matched. As both exhibit impressive moves and fighting tactics, Carolina dislocates Sharkface's shoulder. However, Sharkface quickly fastens it back in place and begins to outmatch Carolina, nearly burning her face off with a flamethrower installed right into his armor. After Carolina breaks free from his grasp she finally realizes who Sharkface is and proceeds to attack. She manages to knock him down onto a frozen lake but Sharkface cracks it open, causing him to fall through into a tunnel, though he grabs Carolina with a grappling hook and drags her down as well. As the two slide their way out of the tunnel, Carolina demands Epsilon activate all of her armor enhancements, though the latter shows worry. Although Epsilon helps Carolina use her bubble shield, Adaptive Camouflage, and Speed Boost against Sharkface, the latter still outdoes her. Feeling overwhelmed, Carolina tells Epsilon to run her healing unit but the latter states that it's too much for him to handle, though she refuses to give up. Sharkface then uses his flamethrowers, combined with a self-made explosion via two frag grenades, to propel himself towards Carolina, forcing her to flee. As she approaches the edge of the cliff Carolina decides to confront Sharkface head on, but Epsilon argues against this. As Carolina turns around to face an incoming Sharkface, Epsilon sends out his memory counterparts of Delta and Theta for help. Unfortunately, both Theta and Delta quickly dematerialize, as Epsilon becomes incapable of running multiple enhancements at once. Unable to help Carolina, Epsilon dematerializes as well. As a result, Carolina trips and falls off the edge of the cliff and lands in the snow below. Sharkface then looks over the ledge and slowly walks away.
250	12	"Off - Key"	June 29, 2015
With the Great Key of Chorus in his possession, Doyle flees towards a large cliff as Felix pursues him. When Felix corners him, Doyle threatens to drop the "sword" down into the chasm below, though Felix doesn't believe he has the courage to do it. As Felix slowly approaches Doyle, demanding that he hand over the sword, Doyle gives in and turns the sword off. However, rather than hand it over to Felix, Doyle tosses the sword high into the air, prompting Felix to lunge for it before it falls down the cliff. As Doyle leaps to the opposite side he spots Tucker, Caboose, Donut, and Lopez approaching and warns them that Felix now has the sword. Upon seeing Felix, the crew fire at him, but the latter takes cover behind his Hardlight Shield and holsters the key onto his thigh. After some quick banter, Felix hitches a ride with Locus when the latter arrives in a Falcon and the two make their escape. Doyle worries over what the pirates will do now that they have the sword but Tucker explains to him that the sword will be useless to the pirates since Doyle is still alive. When Caboose questions Epsilon's whereabouts, Epsilon is shown sitting on Carolina's chest, both being revealed to have survived the fall. He says to himself "She is going to be so pissed off when she wakes up." Eventually the Reds, Blues and the Chorus armies regroup back at Armonia. Inside the War Room the Reds and Blues prattle over the events they had on their respective missions, until an arguing Kimball and Doyle enter the scene. Washington stops their bickering and attempts to keep them focused. Simmons then asks about Carolina's condition, in which Doyle explains that both her and Doc will make a full recovery, thanks to Dr. Grey. Wash then points out that Epsilon's condition is more problematic though Epsilon is not telling them something, as complete armor failure doesn't happen out of the blue. Sarge suggests that they go to the Temple of Communication and contact Earth as quickly as possible. However, both Wash and Doyle state that they shouldn't make hasty moves like they did for Crash Site Alpha, though Kimball argues against them. Doyle rebuttals by stating that if they send Tucker out to the tower he will be killed and Charon will gain two swords. Kimball, in turn, explains to Doyle that they must take risks in order to get results. She then adds that he should've thrown the sword off the mountain and sacrificed himself during his confrontation with Felix, proceeding to call him a "stupid selfish coward," before storming off. Hurt, Doyle returns to his quarters. Wash then acknowledges that while the Feds and Rebels are fighting alongside each other they still do not trust each other. The Reds and Blues state that it took them years to trust each other and tell Wash that it will take time for the Chorus armies to do the same. While Wash agrees, he explains that if they can't bring the armies together then they'll have no chance against Charon.
251	13	"The Thin Fed Line"	July 13, 2015
Inside the Armonia hospital, Donut brings Doc up to speed on the events that have happened on Chorus since his disappearance, specifying Felix's betrayal, the truce between the Federal Army and New Republic, and their current plans to contact Earth of Charon Industries' involvement in the Chorus Civil War. Despite this, Doc becomes furious at the fact that nobody questioned his absence between now and then and grows maniacal like Omega. Upon hearing the sudden change in his tone of voice, Dr. Grey quickly displays interest in Doc's split personality and attempts to conduct electroshock therapy on him, prompting the latter to flee. After Grey and Donut chase after him, Carolina informs Epsilon that they need to talk. Elsewhere, the other Reds and Blues minus Wash attempt to get Palomo and a Fed to socialize peacefully, though the two continue to show acrimony towards each other. Because of this, the crew allow the two to leave. Grif then suggests that they should lie to both Doyle and Kimball by specifying that the other wants to apologize over a dinner, but the others disagree. Sarge then indicates that they must find a neutral party to do the job, just as Doc passes by while being chased by Dr. Grey and Donut. Meanwhile, at the city limits, Carolina questions Epsilon about his sudden disappearance during her fight with Sharkface. Epsilon tries to avoid the question at first but Carolina demands an answer from him. In response, Epsilon explains that although he is not failing, he has his limits and cannot run multiple armor enhancements by himself, due to the fact that he is only an A.I. fragment. While Carolina apologizes to Epsilon for pushing him too far, she acknowledges that his inability to run multiple enhancements can't be used as an excuse, as they must use any advantage they can in order to defeat the Space Pirates. Because of this, Epsilon warns Carolina not to follow in the Meta's footsteps, as his ambition to gain as much power as possible led to his downfall. Offended and hurt, Carolina reveals to Epsilon that she saw her fellow Freelancers die while inside the portal at the Jungle Temple. In addition, she also saw the Blood Gulch Crew die soon after, and fearfully states that she doesn't want to lose another family. Doyle soon appears and consoles Carolina, stating that he knows what it's like to be afraid. He then states that "Courage is not the absence of fear. It is acting in spite of it." though incorrectly states that the quote is from William Shakespeare (The quote is actually from Mark Twain). Despite Doyle's mistake, Epsilon and Carolina acknowledge their liking to the quote. Church hopes that the Space Pirates are having problems too. Meanwhile, at the Space Pirates' base, Felix releases his frustration after discovering that the key will not operate until Doyle is killed and blames Sharkface for not informing them of this earlier. Just before he and Sharkface fight, Locus intervenes and reminds them that they already have a plan and have no business quarreling. He then tells the two to focus on their jobs, prompting Felix and Sharkface to return to their respective objectives. Locus then contacts the Counselor on board the Tartarus, who asks him if he wishes to speak with Carmichael. Locus declines this and asks the Counselor to tell him more about the Meta.
252	14	"Counseling"	July 20, 2015
At Armonia, Doc agrees to help the Reds and Blues get Kimball and Doyle to cooperate, in an attempt to recuperate their relationship, forgiving them for not noticing his absence. Wash soon approaches the crew and warns them that the Federal Army is establishing a perimeter around the city after the New Republic threatened to leave. In order to prevent another civil war from breaking out between the two armies, the crew help Doc hold an "honest and down-to-earth" counseling session between Kimball and Doyle inside the war room. When the two leaders are reluctant to participate, however, Doc gives them an example of how the session will play out by role-playing with Grif; Doc as Grif and Grif vice versa. However, Doc, in the personality of O'Malley, insults Grif and his family while role-playing as him, saddening Grif and Sarge thinking it's great. Meanwhile, Price, stationed inside the Tartarus, questions Locus on why he wishes to know more about the Meta, in which Locus replies that any information about their enemy is beneficial to their success. After Price agrees to help him, Locus asks how the Meta was killed by the Reds and Blues. Price explains that while Maine withstood many lethal injuries that would normally kill a man, the puncture wounds in his armor, caused by Tucker's sword, caused him to die of asphyxiation by drowning. Already aware of this, Locus questions why the Meta was unable to prevent his own demise despite having an advantage, in which Price explains that the Blood Gulch Crew had something the Freelancers never did: the capability to trust each other. However, Price notes that if the Reds and Blues fought the Meta while he still possessed his A.I., events could've played out differently. When Locus asks why, Price reminds him that Agent Maine and the Meta are two different psyches, in which the Meta was the result of Sigma manipulating Maine. He then explains that after the A.I. fragments were destroyed, the Meta psyche was too, leaving Maine a broken shell of a man who uncontrollably continued to follow Sigma's goal. After Locus asks how Maine was before he became the Meta, Price describes that Maine was a brute who displayed no qualms in following orders because he knew that, at his core, he was a soldier whose actions served the greater good. Locus then argues that a soldier's actions should be nothing more than a result of following orders, though Price states that those traits make one a slave. When Locus asks if the Meta was at his best when guided by Sigma's goal of perfection, Price rectifies him saying that the Meta's goal was to be human, not a weapon. Upon hearing this, Locus asks no more questions. Price then notes Locus' change in behavior after his trip through the gateway at the Jungle Temple, with Price noting that the temple shows those who enter the gateway their greatest fear, though Locus denies this. As Price continues to pry he asks Locus if he wants to know what Felix is afraid of most, catching Locus off-guard. Suddenly, Felix appears and informs Locus that he is needed with the rest of the team, prompting Locus to join his comrades. Felix then approaches the Counselor, sarcastically complementing his work on Sharkface. Felix then intentionally wonders what will happen if Sharkface found out the Counselor used to work for Project Freelancer before logging off. Back at Armonia, the Blood Gulch Crew continue to try to get Kimball and Doyle to socialize, this time with Tucker and Caboose (which ended poorly as well), but the two are still reluctant to go through with it. As they begin to argue, Church and Carolina enter the scene, unaware of what's going on. Kimball ultimately decides to leave, but not before Doc stops her and pleads for her to say something nice to Doyle. As a result, Kimball reveals that she initially believed Doyle to be a tyrant bent on control but now sees him as an incompetent individual. Doyle, on the other hand, admits his admiration for Kimball's courage and wished he had the same traits. He then attempts to persuade Kimball to have their armies work together, but Kimball expresses her distrust. Wash then steps in, attempting to hopefully prompt Kimball and Doyle to work together, when a loud boom is heard from outside, causing the War Room to shake and alert the Blood Gulch crew. Smith then contacts the group via intercom and informs them that the Space Pirates are attacking, alarming the group. Doyle is surprised, stating that the Space Pirates wouldn't risk bombing the city, but it is revealed that they are not but dropping space pirates instead. Meanwhile, outside, Sharkface soon lands in the city and leads a squad of space pirates into Armonia.
253	15	"Armonia, Part One"	July 27, 2015
As a firefight ensues between the Space Pirates and Chorus armies throughout the streets of Armonia, the Reds and Blues contemplate on what they should do to survive the attack. While Sarge suggests they fight back, Epsilon proposes another idea, stating that the city is a deathtrap, but not for them. Meanwhile, at the Armonia hospital, the Space Pirates attack and kill two Feds who were attempting to protect Dr. Grey. Fortunately, the attacking pirates are taken out by Palomo, Smith, Bitters and Jensen who inform Grey that they are evacuating the capital. Surprised, Grey asks why, in which the four explain that because the pirates discharged all of their men inside the city, they will be able to take them all out by detonating the city's nuclear reactor. In the streets, Doyle and the Reds and Blues reach the Armory and contact Carolina of their progress. Carolina, alongside Epsilon, Wash and Kimball, informs them to board the Pelican stationed there while they make their way to the reactor's manual overload through the underground maintenance tunnels. As they move forward they suddenly encounter Sharkface. Running out of time, Carolina agrees to stay and face him alone only if he allows Wash and Kimball to leave safely. Sharkface, in response, complies to this but states that he'll come after Wash when he kills Carolina. At the Armory, the Reds and Blues gather weapons and supplies to bring onto the Pelican, with Doc, in the personality of O'Malley, arming himself with a rocket launcher. Donut then alerts them of more mercenaries approaching, prompting Sarge to radio Grif on the status of the Pelican. Grif tells Sarge that he is having trouble getting the aircraft's engine to start and soon realizes that Lopez is trapped inside, who yells at Grif in anger because he was repairing the Pelican when Grif came. After Grif tells the others of this, Freckles alerts the group that the pirates are getting closer, prompting everyone to hide. The pirates then arrive to the Armory, and unfortunately, the Red's and Blue's are quickly discovered because of their poor hiding spots. As the mercs prepare to open fire, Doc/O'Malley eliminates them with his rocket launcher. With more pirates approaching, the crew decide to hold down the Armory until Lopez is released from the Pelican. Meanwhile, in an isolated part of the city, the fight between Carolina and Sharkface escalates, with the two bursting through the ground towards the surface. As Sharkface begins to mock Carolina, the latter suddenly apologizes for what she and Project Freelancer did to him and his comrades, pointing out that they were both on two different sides with individual goals, and she believed Project Freelancer to be the good guys. While surprised, Sharkface refutes her apology, angrily stating that it won't change what she and the Freelancers did and won't bring back his dead comrades. Understanding, Carolina tells Sharkface that she doesn't want to fight and offers him the choice to simply walk away. Muddled by Carolina's actions, Sharkface again refuses and proceeds to attack her.
254	16	"Armonia, Part Two"	August 3, 2015
The Space Pirates continue firing upon the armory in order to get to Tucker and Doyle, but are unable to get inside due to the Blood Gulch Crew's combined firepower. As the crew fend off the pirates, Simmons informs them that he has successfully removed Lopez from the Pelican, prompting them to retreat to the garage to board the ship. However, Doyle decides to stay behind, explaining that the pirates will simply follow them once they leave on the Pelican, destroying their chances of killing them all in the city. So, in order to keep the mercenaries inside Armonia, Doyle flees on a Mongoose, inciting the pirates to chase after him and letting the Reds and Blues escape. As the Reds and Blues fly away on the Pelican in order to get Tucker to safety, the latter informs Wash and Kimball of Doyle’s actions. Angered, Wash and Kimball contact Doyle and question his plan. Doyle tells them that he is the only thing keeping Charon inside the city and asks how long it will take for them to reach the reactor. Wash, in response, tells Doyle that he is unsure as Epsilon is not with them to guide them through the tunnels. Because of this, Doyle decides to go and set off the reactor himself, telling the two that he will meet them at the extraction point once he is done. Wash and Kimball then move towards the surface to assist Carolina. Meanwhile, Carolina and Sharkface brawl inside the monorail. However, unlike their last battle, Carolina is shown to be more focused, dodging several of Sharkface's attacks and even managing to outmatch him. When Sharkface attempts to attack her with his grappling hook, Carolina dodges it, with the hook attaching to a door. As the monorail reaches the LZ, Carolina pulls the hook's wire and launches the door it's connected to straight at Sharkface, throwing him out onto the street below. After Carolina jumps out of the monorail, she and Sharkface are left exhausted. As Wash and Kimball arrive to aid Carolina, the latter tells Sharkface that he has lost. Sharkface, however, refuses to accept this and declares that as long as he is alive he will continue to hunt them down until they're all dead. As a result, Wash and Kimball swiftly execute Sharkface. Wash then contacts the Reds and informs them that they have made it to the extraction point. The Reds, in response, inform Wash that they have safely dropped off the Blues and are heading to the LZ now. Kimball then radios Doyle and asks him if he's ready, in which the latter states that he is almost finished. Suddenly, a space pirate corners Doyle and fires at him, but Doyle ducks and manages to kill the pirate. Unfortunately, the mercenary's bullets destroy the reactor controls, making it impossible for Doyle to overload the reactor remotely. With no other option, Doyle equips himself with a Sticky Detonator left behind by the dead pirate and informs Kimball, Wash, and Carolina that he will have to detonate the reactor's core himself. Concerned, Kimball volunteers to help Doyle, but Doyle denies her request, finalizing his decision to risk his own life in order to protect them, just like she would have done. As the Reds arrive at the extraction point, Kimball, distressed, warns Doyle that if Felix isn't in the city he will be placing the sword right into his hands. Doyle, in response, expresses his confidence that she will be able to stop Felix if he isn't. As Carolina and Wash get Kimball inside the ship, Doyle reaches the reactor's core and sticks a sticky grenade onto it, just as the pirates make their way towards him. With the grenade set to explode in less than a minute, Doyle demands that Kimball and the others leave the city quickly, though Kimball pleads for Doyle to stop. Doyle then says his final goodbyes to Kimball by telling her that Chorus still needs her, and to make sure that the people she leaves behind will be able to carry on without her, before signing off. As Kimball finally boards the Pelican, she and the others fly out of the city. As the space pirates find and surround Doyle at the reactor core they quickly discover his grenade and proceed to warn Locus and Felix on board the Tartarus. The two mercenaries, as a result, order the pilot to get them out of the city. The grenade then explodes, creating a nuclear blast that destroys Armonia, kills Doyle and a large number of space pirates. Meanwhile, Kimball and the Blood Gulch Crew attempt to flee from the explosion as fast as possible but are unable to escape the blast radius. In order to protect the ship, Carolina, with Epsilon's assistance, activates her domed energy shield, just as the blast reaches them.
255	17	"All or Nothing"	August 17, 2015
After successfully deploying Carolina’s bubble shield, and in turn saving the Reds, Wash and Kimball from the nuclear blast, Epsilon briefly cycles through his memories of Theta, Delta, and Omega, before awakening at Crash Site Bravo in front of a relieved Blood Gulch Crew. Carolina informs Epsilon that the Feds and Rebels are scattered across the planet as a result of Armonia's destruction, with several soldiers mourning at Bravo. She then expresses her concern for Kimball, as the Feds blame her for Doyle’s death. Wash then approaches the two and explains to Epsilon that Felix and Locus survived the nuclear blast. Meanwhile, it is revealed that Locus and Felix have regrouped at the Jungle Temple, with the Great Key now fully functional for Felix. As the two approach Santa in preparation to activate the Purge, Felix asks him if they will be safe from the Purge’s effects. Santa, drearily, assures him that those residing inside the Temple of the Purge will be spared. While Felix exhibits his joy of the news Locus expresses his concern about the safety of the space pirates guarding the communication temple. Felix tries to persuade Locus to simply let them die, but Locus insinuates his disagreement, saying that some of them are former partners. In response, Felix explains that their comrades’ trust in them does not allow them immunity and states that survival is a privilege that must be earned. A space pirate then radios the two and informs them that Control would like to speak to them about the loss of Armonia’s artifacts. Felix decides to go speak with the Chairman himself and wonders if the latter would be interested in an alien A.I. After Felix leaves, Santa expresses his growing skepticism of him actually being a true warrior. Locus then asks Santa on what Felix saw after he passed through the portal and what he is afraid of. Santa tells Locus that the answer is obvious, before disappearing to prepare for the Purge. Back at Bravo, the Blood Gulch Crew finalize their plan. Knowing that Locus will be with Felix, Carolina and Wash agree to go on “defense” (preventing Felix and Locus from activating The Purge) while the Reds and Blues go on “offense” (They along with the Chorus armies assaulting the Communications Temple). However, the Reds and Doc bring up the fact that they are low on ammo and the armies are still not working together, in which Kimball, who approaches the crew, suggests that she talk to them. While concerned, the crew allow her to speak with the armies. Kimball manages to get the attention of all the Fed and Rebel soldiers scattered around Chorus and begins her speech. She admits that she didn’t believe the armies’ truce would last even if they managed to defeat Charon, as she still saw the Federal Army as the enemy. However, she explains to the soldiers that when one spends everyday fighting a war, one learns to demonize the enemy and begins seeing them as evil or even sub-human. Kimball then admits that she was afraid to see what the Federal Army truly were: their brothers and sisters. She adds that while they’ve all done horrible things to each other, Doyle was able to see past that and understood that their fight against Charon was a time for unity. Kimball tells the armies that if they don’t unite and fight as one they won’t have a tomorrow and persuades the soldiers of Chorus to fight with her in order to defeat the Chairman and the Space Pirates once and for all. In response to her speech, all of the Feds and Rebels ecstatically cheer to Kimball in unity (except Palomo, who instead accidentally reveals he has a crush on Jenson). After the Blood Gulch Crew commend Kimball on her rousing speech, Kimball informs them that they still have something Charon doesn’t. The Reds and Blues then venture back to the Charon Excavation Site, where they are warmly welcomed by Santa. Tucker then approaches the temple and pulls out his sword, reactivating the Temple of Arms.
256	18	"Great Destroyers"	August 24, 2015
Felix and Locus arrive at the Purge but are suddenly shocked to discover Wash, Epsilon, and Carolina standing in their path. Wash attempts to talk them out of activating the temple as it will kill both the people of Chorus as well as their own men. Though Locus ponders over this, Felix convinces him that they must follow their orders. Meanwhile, the rest of the space pirates are shown guarding the Communication Temple, until one of them spots Kimball nearby. Kimball quickly kills the pirate with an alien rifle and is soon accompanied by numerous Feds and Rebels, all armed with alien weaponry. As the pirates open fire, Kimball orders the combined armies to attack, which they proudly do. Finally united as one, the Feds and Rebels quickly lay waste to several of the remaining pirates, with the Reds and Blues, armed with an alien tank, assisting in the assault. Now under heavy fire, the pirates send a distress call to Felix, Locus, and the Counselor, who is aboard the Tartarus, explaining that the armies have obtained several alien armaments. Running out of time, Felix and Locus fire at Wash and Carolina, who proceed to take cover. When Locus manages to disarm Carolina, Wash, in turn, lobs a grenade into the air to distract Locus. When Locus shoots the grenade, Wash shoots and disables Locus' Sniper rifle, forcing the two mercs to restrategize. As a result, the two charge towards the Freelancers, with Felix using his Hardlight Shield as cover while Locus jumps onto a hovering platform, in order to reach the temple's back entrance. Using her grappling hook, Carolina pursues Locus and the two engage in combat. All the while, Wash engages Felix, with Felix attempting to kill Wash with his daggers. After Wash dodges Felix's attacks, however, Felix pulls out his sword. Meanwhile, on board the Tartarus, the Counselor suggests to the pirates on the bridge that they abandon the mission. Informed by Felix that Price might turn on them, the Space Pirate partnered with Price attempts to kill him as a result but notices that his pistol is missing. Price, having stolen the latter's pistol, kills the merc and forces the pilot to fly the ship away from Chorus. Back at the Purge, Felix fights off Wash and rushes towards the temple. After Wash warns Carolina, the latter catches Felix with her grappling hook and proceeds to reel him in. However, as Felix is dragged off the side of the pathway he grabs Wash and threatens to drop the latter if Carolina drops him. As a result, Carolina pulls the two onto the bottom of the hovering platform she and Locus are on. After a brief clash between the two pairs, the four regroup on the top of the platform, but quickly duck after a larger one hovers over. After Felix and Locus hop onto the platform, Carolina and Wash chase after them, eventually ending up on the same platform as the two mercs. As Carolina fights Felix, Wash struggles to battle a cloaked Locus. So, in order to see him, Wash slices his hand with one of Felix's daggers and throws the blood onto Locus' chest plate, proceeding to impale the dagger itself into his chest plate upon finding him. After Locus knocks Wash down, he tries to stab him, but Wash blocks him and explains that if he kills him it will prove that he is a killer. As Locus calls Felix for help, Felix slashes Carolina's back and attempts to stab Wash himself. Luckily, Wash pushes Locus off him and dodges Felix's attack, who instead impales the platform's center, disabling it. With the platform going down, the four hop back onto the pathway, where Wash and Carolina reveal that they were only attempting to stall them and explain that although Armonia was destroyed, the pirates left their own home base, Crash Site Alpha, wide open. At Alpha, Dr. Grey and the lieutenants reactivate the tractor beams, drawing the Tartarus back towards the planet; specifically, straight to the Purge. As a result, Wash, Carolina, Locus and Felix flee from the temple, with the former two taking cover within Carolina's bubble shield and the latter two taking cover behind Felix's light shield. The Tartarus then crashes into the temple, destroying it and killing the Counselor. Fortunately, thanks to Epsilon's assistance, Wash and Carolina survive and the three leave to regroup with Kimball and the others. Nearby, however, Felix draws out his arm from a pile of rubble, having survived the destruction.
257	19	"The End Is Near"	August 31, 2015
The battle between the Chorus armies and space pirates rages on at the Communication Temple, with the former army beginning to overwhelm the latter. As the pirates are forced to fall back, Kimball and the Reds and Blues move forward towards the entrance of the temple. Tucker soon joins them, accompanied with Wash, Epsilon and Carolina, who inform the crew of the destruction of the Purge as well as the deaths of Felix and Locus. Epsilon then notifies them of a teleporter inside the temple that leads to the control room. Just then, a Mantis operated by the space pirates begins killing several Chorus soldiers. Because of this, Carolina gives Epsilon to Tucker and allows the Reds and Blues to go to the control room while she and Wash stay and fight outside with the Chorus armies. After the Reds and Blues pass through the teleporter they arrive at the control room and are greeted by Santa. As Santa begins preparing the temple for activation, he then mentions that there may be a small problem. When Tucker asks Santa what that may be, he disappears in time for the crew to discover Felix flying towards them in a Falcon. As the crew scatter, the Falcon crashes down at the control room. Felix, along with an exhausted Locus, readies himself to fight the Reds and Blues. As he tries to force Locus to join him, the latter explains that, with the Tartarus destroyed and their numbers low, their mission has failed. However, Felix furiously tells him that he is not doing this for the mission or Hargrove but for himself and leaves to find the crew. Outside the temple, Wash is contacted by Tucker, who informs him that Felix and Locus are alive and are inside the control room. Being unable to help them, Wash tells Tucker that he and the others will have to deal with them alone, but expresses his confidence that they will come out successful, with the exception of Doc disagreeing. As Felix searches for the crew, Locus struggles to keep up with him and soon collapses. Santa reveals himself to him and asks why he is doing what he’s doing, but Locus repeatedly replies that he doesn’t know. When Santa asks Locus if he would like to know something Locus requests to know what Felix is afraid of. Santa, in response, tells Locus that Felix is afraid of him. Meanwhile, Felix calls out to Tucker in fury until the latter confronts him. After a brief Sword fight, Felix knocks Tucker to the ground, until the other Reds and Blues intervene and attack Felix, quickly overpowering him. When Felix becomes surrounded, Locus approaches the crew, but does not harm them. Instead he gives up his weapon and tells Felix that he is not a soldier, but a monster like him. Felix pleads Locus to rethink what he’s doing but Locus disregards him. As a result, Felix attacks everyone but quickly gets a sticky grenade caught on his hardlight shield, fired by Simmons. Tucker then throws a frag grenade towards Felix, which blasts him over the edge of the control room and sends him plummeting to his death. With Felix dead, Locus, having obtained Felix's sword after the latter threw it at him, becomes the new bearer of the Great Key and activates the Comm. Temple for the Reds and Blues. While the crew refuse to forgive Locus for everything he has done, the latter expresses his understanding and explains that he will make things right, though he will not be imprisoned. Epsilon warns Locus that if he runs they will find him, but Locus assures him that they will not, before cloaking. With the temple now active, the crew proceed to broadcast their message. The process is successful as the message, spoken by Epsilon, quickly transmits to several communication devices across the galaxy, including the UNSC HQ on Earth, a Sangheili Embassy where Junior, alive and fully grown, resides, and even Blood Gulch, finally confirming Sister's continued existence. With the message and its files making its way across the galaxy, the receivers are made aware of Chorus’ location, the survival of the Reds and Blues, and Chairman Hargrove’s crimes on the planet. After Epsilon ends the message, the Feds and Rebels rejoice, having destroyed the Mantis as well as defeating the remaining space pirates. Kimball then happily informs the crew of a ship approaching Chorus from slipspace. Unfortunately, the ship is revealed to be the Staff of Charon, with Hargrove himself, stationed inside the ship, proclaiming that the group has made a terrible mistake.
258	20	"The End"	September 7, 2015
The Chairman releases numerous Mantis droids around the Comms. Temple and begins annihilating both Chorus troopers and Space Pirates left and right, saying if he is going down then he is taking them all with him. With Wash, Carolina, Kimball, and the rest of the Feds and Rebels forced to take cover, the Reds and Blues contemplate a way to shut down the robots. Epsilon states that they must reach the Staff of Charon in order to override the Mantises' controls. So, in order to get inside the ship, the crew board Locus and Felix's damaged Falcon and fly it towards the Staff of Charon. After successfully getting inside, the crew search around the ship's engine room for the override controls, and soon discover F.I.L.S.S. F.I.L.S.S. explains that she was recovered by Hargrove and was illegally reassigned to work under him. When Epsilon pleads for her to shut down the Mantises, F.I.L.S.S., despite the action violating Hargrove's orders, gladly agrees to help, due to her deep dislike for the Chairman. Unfortunately, Hargrove stops F.I.L.S.S. from deactivating the droids and sends his own forces to attack the crew, prompting them to flee. As Hargrove's forces corner the crew, F.I.L.S.S. uses the ship's blast doors to protect them. She then directs the Reds and Blues to the location of the terminal containing the override controls: the Chairman's trophy room. As casualties build up outside the temple, the Reds and Blues hurry to the Chairman's trophy room. Upon reaching it, Tucker and Epsilon enter the room while the other Reds and Blues stand guard outside. Epsilon quickly becomes angered upon seeing Tex's cracked visor and orders F.I.L.S.S. to bring up the terminal to the Mantis controls, which she does. As Epsilon gets to work on overriding the controls, Hargrove, speaking to the two from the ship's bridge, admonishes that the crew will not leave the ship alive. Tucker, however, remains unfazed and shuts down the Mantises after Epsilon finishes overriding the controls. After the Mantises all shut down outside, the Feds and Rebels rejoice. Back in the trophy room, the Reds and Blues rush in and seal themselves inside as Hargrove's forces close in. Epsilon contacts Carolina demanding an extraction, in which Carolina states that they will fire up a Pelican to pick them up in a few minutes. Unfortunately, Hargrove's forces immediately begin welding through the door, shortening the crew's time to make their escape. As a result, the Reds and Blues bravely prepare themselves for the oncoming attack, with Grif arming himself with his Brute shot, Lopez, Doc, and Donut barricading the door, and Simmons attempting to start up the Monitor. Tucker, concerned, asks Epsilon if they can win, but the latter explains that they still need one more piece. Having discovered it while overriding the Mantis controls, Epsilon has F.I.L.S.S. release the Meta's modified suit and asks Tucker to put it on. After Tucker dons the suit, he changes the color to his regular aqua. Hargove's forces prepare to breach into the room with blowtorches. In response, the Blood Gulch Crew say their goodbyes to one another and ready themselves for the impending attack. Epsilon then states that out of everyone he's met he hates the crew the least, in which Tucker responds saying that he'll see him on the other side. Suddenly, time slows down, with Epsilon assuring that he will not make it back. Epsilon-Delta soon appears and asks Epsilon if he really wants to go through with this, in which Epsilon ensures that he does. Epsilon then begins a recording and says his final goodbyes to the Reds and Blues before dematerializing for good: "Hey guys... if you're hearing this then it means you did it. You won. You kicked the shit out of Hargrove's forces. I knew you could. But this is my last stop. See, when I came into this world, I was really just a collection of somebody else's memories. But with your help, these memories... they-they took form! They became my voice, my personality. And, after a while, I... I began to make brand new memories of my own. All of these things are what make me who I am... but they're also holding me back. I can't run this suit as Epsilon, but if I erase my memories, if I... deconstruct myself, the fragments I'll leave behind will have the strength to get you through this. I believe that. I wish that there was another way. But, I'm leaving this message as well as others, in the hopes that you'll understand why I have to go this time...hehe, it was actually Doyle who made me realize something that I've never thought of before. There are so many stories where some brave hero decides to give their life to save the day, and because of their sacrifice, the good guys win, the survivors all cheer, and everybody lives happily ever after. But the hero... never gets to see that ending. They'll never know if their sacrifice actually made a difference. They'll never know if the day was really saved. In the end, they just have to have faith. Ain't that a bitch." After he gives his speech to the team he deconstructs himself.

=== Anthology ===
==== Season 14 (2016) ====
A collection of canonical and non-canonical stories of the RVB universe.

No. Overall	No. in Season	Title	Directed by	Written by	Original release date
259	1	"Room Zero"	Burnie Burns ("Room Zero"), Miles Luna ("Zero Rooms")	Burnie Burns ("Room Zero"), Miles Luna ("Zero Rooms")	May 8, 2016 (FIRST); May 15, 2016
Grif, Simmons, and Church team up to rescue the other members of their teams. However it goes south and Church flies out of the prison strapped to a rocket. It's revealed that it was a simulation as Epsilon Church grows frustrated reliving the simulations. Another copy of Epsilon Church shows up, reminding him what they were getting into when they sealed themselves in the Epsilon Unit to find Tex. A new simulation starts in Blood Gulch, setting up the events of Season 9. Note: The first part of this episode ("Room Zero") was originally a pilot for a Red vs. Blue animated series (Red vs. Blue: Animated) which got scrapped.
260	2	"From Stumbled Beginnings"	Kyle Taylor	Jordan Cwierz	May 15, 2016 (FIRST); May 22, 2016
The story of how Grif and Simmons met, as the two were stationed at Death Valley, and after surviving a mission by simply not raiding Blue Base while another private went there and was killed by a bomb left by the Blues, wound up assigned to Blood Gulch.
261	3	"Fifty Shades of Red"	Kyle Taylor	Jordan Cwierz	May 22, 2016 (FIRST); May 29, 2016
Sarge attains the position of Red Sergeant due to all the other candidates (all of whom share his mindset) dying. Meanwhile, Agent Florida searches for the last member of Blue Team, and settles on Lavernius Tucker.
262	4	"Why They're Here"	Kyle Taylor	Jordan Cwierz	May 29, 2016 (FIRST); June 5, 2016
Private Jimmy is implanted with the Alpha A.I, and is sent to Blood Gulch as Private Leonard Church. After inspecting Blood Gulch's Red Team, Florida comes to the conclusion that the Blood Gulch war will be a stalemate for a long time. Later on, V.I.C. malfunctions due to Florida tripping on a wire, giving V.I.C. his peculiar personality and replacing the intended Freelancer "reinforcements" (Agents California, Hawaii, and Kansas) with Caboose, Donut, and Grif's sister.
263	5	"The Brick Gulch Chronicles"	Joe Nicolosi	Joe Nicolosi	June 5, 2016 (FIRST); June 12, 2016
Mega Bloks versions of Grif, Simmons, Church, and Donut, animated using stop motion, attempt to return to their bases while being pursued by a young boy intending to use them as test subjects.
264	6	"Orange is the New Red"	Joshua Ornelas	James Willems	June 12, 2016 (FIRST); June 19, 2016
The Reds of Blood Gulch Outpost #1 aren't the only soldiers hunting down Blues. This episode introduces the exploits of Red Army Unit FH57.
265	7	"Invaders from Another Mother"	Joshua Ornelas	James Willems	June 19, 2016 (FIRST); June 26, 2016
Red Army Unit FH57 stumble upon Blood Gulch.
266	8	"The #1 Movie in the Galaxy: 3"	Freddie Wong	Freddie Wong	June 26, 2016 (FIRST); July 3, 2016
Sarge, Tucker, Grif, Simmons, Donut, and Washington watch the trailer for "Sarge v Tucker: The Origin of Sin."
267	9	"Club"	Miles Luna	Miles Luna	July 3, 2016 (FIRST); July 10, 2016
Taking place before the Chorus trilogy, Locus, Felix, and newcomer Siris take on a job to turn in Gabriel Lozano.
268	10	"Call"	Miles Luna	Miles Luna	July 10, 2016 (FIRST); July 17, 2016
Locus, Felix and Siris got Gabriel Lozano, but the job goes south real fast when Lozano's bounty and criminal record is erased and his father, crime boss Ruben, gets involved.
269	11	"Consequences"	Miles Luna	Miles Luna	July 17, 2016 (FIRST); July 24, 2016
Locus, Felix and Siris make their final stand against Ruben Lozano and his underlings.
270	12	"Fight the Good Fight!"	Joshua Ornelas	Alex Leonard	July 24, 2016 (FIRST); July 31, 2016
The Blood Gulch crew appear in a propaganda campaign, demonizing the Blue team, and making the Red team look like the best military unit in the universe.
271	13	"Meta vs. Carolina: Dawn of Awesome"	Ben Singer	Chad James, Ben Singer	July 31, 2016 (FIRST); August 7, 2016 (Note: This Episode also aired on August 3rd on Screw Attack's website.)
Grif, Simmons, and Caboose argue over who would win in a fight between Carolina and the Meta, so they go to "experts" Wiz and Boomstick. This episode is a crossover with Death Battle.
272	14	"Grey vs. Gray"	Joshua Ornelas	Barry Kramer, Miles Luna, Brian Wecht	August 7, 2016 (FIRST); August 14, 2016
An unrelated group of colorblind Reds and Blues (voiced by members of both Rooster Teeth and Game Grumps) are trapped in a room together.
273	15	"Caboose's Guide to Making Friends"	Miles Luna	Miles Luna	August 14, 2016 (FIRST); August 21, 2016
Caboose hosts this episode, sharing his tips on how to (literally) make friends.
274	16	"Head Cannon"	Joshua Ornelas	Barbara Dunkelman	August 21, 2016 (FIRST); August 28, 2016
In a flashback to Episode 100, as the Omega A.I. infects the soldiers of Blood Gulch, the viewers see into their minds.
275	17	"Get Bent"	Allison Baker, Kyle Taylor	Chris Roberson	August 28, 2016 (FIRST); September 4, 2016
In the Memory unit, Epsilon attempts to recreate Blood Gulch, but accidentally makes the Red team all girls; later on, Church also discovers Tex is a guy. He's okay with Tex being a guy, but refuses to accept the female Reds, so Church tries again, only to find that this time, he accidentally made himself female, with Tucker trying to hit on him.
276	18	"Red vs. Blue: The Musical"	Nico Audy-Rowland, Miles Luna, Joshua Ornelas	Nico Audy-Rowland, Miles Luna	September 4, 2016 (FIRST); September 11, 2016
A musical retelling of the Blood Gulch Chronicles that turns out to be Donut's account of it for the armies of Chorus.
277	19	"Mr. Red vs. Mr. Blue"	Kyle Taylor	Ernest Cline	September 11, 2016 (FIRST); September 18, 2016
In-between seasons 5 and 6, Tucker repeatedly invites the Reds (and Doc) to a movie night truce to watch Reservoir Dogs, making everyone else sick of the movie. Caboose accidentally destroys their only copy, to everyone's joy. Tucker, however, is heartbroken, so the remaining Reds and Blues decide to remake the film, if only to stop him from playing "Stuck in the Middle with You" on repeat.
278	20	"RvB Throwdown"	Jeremy Dooley	Jeremy Dooley	September 18, 2016 (FIRST); September 25, 2016
Church engages Sarge in a rap battle.
279	21	"The Triplets"	Kyle Taylor	Shannon McCormick	September 25, 2016 (FIRST); October 2, 2016
The three most incompetent Freelancers decide to make their mark, though they fail miserably.
280	22	"The "Mission""	Kyle Taylor	Shannon McCormick	October 2, 2016 (FIRST); October 9, 2016
The Triplets discover their first mission was actually just a way to get rid of them.
281	23	"Immersion: The Warthog Flip"	Daniel Fabelo	Daniel Fabelo	October 9, 2016 (FIRST); October 16, 2016
Scientists from Rooster Teeth determine how much force would actually be needed to flip the Red Team's trademarked Warthog. This episode is a crossover with Rooster Teeth's Immersion.
282	24	"Red vs. Blue vs. Rooster Teeth"	Matt Hullum	Matt Hullum	October 16, 2016 (FIRST); October 23, 2016
A freak accident at Rooster Teeth brings Donut, Sarge, Simmons, Grif, Caboose and Lopez into their offices, with all but the first interacting with their voice actors.

=== The Shisno Trilogy ===
==== Season 15 (2017) ====
An investigative reporter and her bumbling cameraman search for the Reds and Blues and answers for attacks on the UNSC.

No. Overall	No. in Season	Title	Original release date
283	1	"Prologue"	April 2, 2017 (FIRST); April 9, 2017
In the wake of a violent assault on a UNSC supply depot seemingly done by the Reds and Blues on behalf of Chorus, who wish to remain independent from the UNSC, Interstellar Daily reporter Dylan Andrews is determined to find out the truth. Her boss Carlos chastises her that nobody cares about the Reds and Blues anymore after they disappeared in the aftermath of the Chorus war ten months prior, and that they are just common criminals now. Dylan, however, is curious as to what would cause the Reds and Blues to turn to crime, and convinces Carlos to give her one week to complete her investigation.
284	2	"The Chronicle"	April 9, 2017 (FIRST); April 16, 2017
Dylan begins her search for the Reds and Blues, joined by new and inexperienced cameraman Jax Jonez, Carlos' nephew who just got out of film school. Her first stop is Blood Gulch, the original home of the Reds and Blues. There Dylan finds Kaikaina Grif, Dexter Grif's younger sister, who tells them that the Reds and Blues crime spree is all a lie, she knows that her brother and his friends are harmless. Kaikaina then tells them to see VIC, the AI that originally ran the Blood Gulch simulation. Upon meeting VIC, he tells Dylan and Jax that he has video footage of the Reds and Blue during their time at Blood Gulch. VIC then tells Dylan that he will give her three wishes, after which she will agree to delete him, as he has grown tired of existence. Dylan agrees and uses her first wish to gain all of VIC's video recordings of the Reds and Blues (which he has edited to 5 minute installments, referencing the first five seasons). Meanwhile, a mysterious figure watches them from a far distance.
285	3	"The Mother of Destruction"	April 16, 2017 (FIRST); April 23, 2017
The search for the Reds and Blues takes Dylan and Jax to the crashed remains of Project Freelancer's flagship, the Mother of Invention. They are ambushed by the Reds and Blues, who refuse Dylan's attempt to question them and prepare to shoot her on sight when the mysterious figure arrives, asking the whereabouts of Lavernius Tucker. This provides enough distraction for Dylan and Jax to escape, and they are greeted by the mysterious stranger, who confirms that he is looking for Tucker to "serve him" before disappearing. Dylan realizes that the Reds and Blues they have encountered are imposters due a number of inconsistencies in their behavior and the weapons they were carrying, concluding they have some different, sinister motive for attacking the UNSC. She decides to head for Chorus, which is now under a blockade by a UNSC fleet.
286	4	"Chorus Lessons"	April 23, 2017 (FIRST); April 30, 2017
After arriving on Chorus, Jax is shot in the buttocks and taken to the hospital for medical care. Dylan meets with Dr. Emily Grey who has been assigned to treat Jax, but Emily quickly sees through Dylan, surmising that Dylan deliberately shot Jax to get close to her. Dylan admits it, hoping Grey could get her an audience with Vanessa Kimball, who is now the President of Chorus. Grey replies that Kimball is too busy, trying to reopen peace talks with the UNSC, and she would not tell Dylan anyway due to the media tarnishing the Reds and Blues' names, and by extension Chorus'. She does, however, tell Dylan the name of the local UNSC diplomat. With some information gained from her estranged husband, Dylan blackmails the diplomat into reopening peace talks, which in turn convinces Kimball to allow an audience. Dylan manages to convince Kimball and Santa that her intention to find the truth is genuine. Kimball reveals the secret location where the Reds and Blues moved onto to enjoy retirement, as well as an urgent message that she received needs to be delivered to them. Dylan and Jax, who decided to stay despite being shot, fly away to a remote planet, where Dylan encounters Caboose in a parody of the ending of Star Wars: The Force Awakens.
287	5	"Previously On"	April 30, 2017 (FIRST); May 7, 2017
Dylan finds the other Reds and Blues (except for Doc) and sits down with the group to finally hear the full story of their actions since Chorus, which included: building homes and a water park, both of which were burnt down by Donut; Caboose befriending dinosaurs that later fought a robot army built by Sarge; attempting to start a band; creating a new form of government, malarkey; Caboose going to an alternate dimension inspired by Stranger Things; Simmons learning the now-dead language Esperanto mistaking it for Spanish; Donut becoming a nudist; Sarge declaring war on gravity itself after getting bored with peace, using the group's jeeps as weapons; and Grif discovered highly stimulating mushrooms, described as being "crystal meth on crystal meth". In effect, despite retiring, their lives had not changed at all. Once everything has been said and calmed, Tucker mentions that they managed to capture Hargrove and escape the Staff of Charon thanks to Epsilon/Church sacrificing himself. He also mentions activating the Temple of Procreation to celebrate, causing the population of Chorus to have a worldwide orgy (while Grif and Simmons were trapped in a closet together). Dylan tells them about the impostors and how all of the remaining Freelancers have gone missing. She then shows them the message Kimball gave her, which is revealed to be a garbled distress call from Church.
288	6	"Reacts"	May 7, 2017 (FIRST); May 14, 2017
The message sent by Kimball spurs the Reds and Blues into immediate action. Tucker and Caboose leap to the rescue, while Carolina and Wash urge caution and patience. Meanwhile, Sarge is glad to finally have another battle to fight and attempts to rally the Red Team into helping him battle the imaginary "White Team". The Reds and Blues agree to go and find Church, though they notice that Grif is missing. Dylan tries to convince Grif to go along, but he is tired of being dragged into one adventure after another and angrily refuses. Washington announces that he and Carolina will go visit some of their fellow Freelancers to find some leads while Tucker, Dylan, Jax and the rest of the Reds and Blues try to trace Church's message.
289	7	"Nightmare on Planet Evil"	May 14, 2017 (FIRST); May 21, 2017
The Reds and Blues travel with Dylan to an abandoned planet, where they investigate one of the transmission sources. While Dylan analyzes the relay the signal bounced off of, the Reds and Blues decide to explore the abandoned city for clues. However, they soon become unnerved by their surroundings, which they fear may be haunted. Tucker is eventually found by the mysterious figure, who says he is not here to fight, but to serve him, making Tucker confirm his identity. The figure turns out not be a servant, but a process server named Spencer Porkinsenson, who serves court documents of a class action lawsuit ordering Tucker to pay child support for the numerous children he fathered on Chorus following the activation of the Temple of Procreation. As the Reds and Blues leave, the imposter Sarge watches their ship and reports to his leader "Temple" that the Reds and Blues are on their way to his location.
290	8	"A Fistful of Colours"	May 21, 2017 (FIRST); May 28, 2017
The Reds and Blues find themselves at a location that appears to be a replica of Blood Gulch called Desert Gulch. They then meet the Blues and Reds, the group responsible for the attacks on the UNSC. The members consist of Temple, Loco, Bucky, Surge, Gene, Cronut, and Lorenzo (stand ins for Church, Caboose, Tucker, Sarge, Simmons, Donut, and Lopez, respectively). They explain that they are simulation troopers like the Reds and Blues, hence why they are so similar. They also explain that the UNSC had been hunting down anyone involved with Project Freelancer, and that they believe Church is being held prisoner by them, which is why they have been attacking the UNSC and using the relays to contact the Reds and Blues. Though they claim them attacking Dylan was an accident. A UNSC squadron then attacks the two groups. They are able to repel the UNSC attack, but Lopez and Lorenzo are both destroyed save their heads. The Blues and Reds lead the Reds and Blues to their secret underwater base, where they are safe from the UNSC.
291	9	"Rigged"	May 28, 2017 (FIRST); June 4, 2017
As the Reds and Blues mingle with the Blues and Reds, Tucker meets with Temple, who begins to sow seeds of mistrust between him and Dylan by pointing out how she failed to warn him about Spencer and it was probably due to her that Spencer found him. Tucker then encounters Doc, who has been living with the Blues and Reds this whole time. He explains that the Blues and Reds were in fact the predecessors to the Reds and Blues and that he knew them before he was transferred to Blood Gulch. Dylan corroborates this by mentioning that Desert Gulch was apparently a prototype for the other simulations, although it is noted that the Blues and Reds have no analogue for Grif. After the Reds and Blues help Temple scavenge parts for their base's cloaking device, Temple asks Tucker where Washington and Carolina are. Both Freelancers are shown standing on a tropical island.
292	10	"Battlescars"	June 4, 2017 (FIRST); June 11, 2017
Washington and Carolina search for Agent Illinois, but find his house abandoned. Carolina reminisces about Illinois, and how his dream was to retire to a secluded tropical island. She begins to have regrets about not pursuing a relationship with York, but Wash assures her that it is not too late to start over. Wash then gets the idea to activate their Freelancer beacons to lure whoever is hunting down the Freelancers to them. However, the Blue and Red teams arrive instead, citing how they detected the beacons. Wash and Carolina travel with them back to the underwater base. Temple then offers to show them something important and leads them to a room containing the armors of the other Freelancers. Wash and Carolina discover to their horror that the other Freelancers had their armor forcibly locked while still alive, and their corpses are still rotting inside their suits. Temple then locks Washington and Carolina's armors, admitting that he lied about the UNSC hunting down the Freelancers, and that what he is doing is for revenge against the Freelancers. When Washington claims the Reds and Blues will find out about his plan, Temple boasts that they will be dead by then before leaving Wash and Carolina to die.
293	11	"Belly of the Beast"	June 11, 2017 (FIRST); June 18, 2017
Dylan, suspicious of the Blues and Reds due to their efforts to keep her in the dark, decides to do some investigation on her own. While Jax distracts Sarge, Dylan snoops around the base and spies a conversation between Temple and Loco, who is working on the cloaking device. However, Temple's angry rants reveal that what he claimed was a cloaking device in fact has a different function. Dylan meets with Tucker and informs him of all of the Blues and Reds' suspicious behavior. Tucker informs her that Temple has a networked computer in his office that she can use. Dylan sneaks into Temple's office and uses VIC's second wish to hack into his computer. VIC finds something, but then Temple arrives and confronts Dylan.
294	12	"Blue vs. Red"	June 18, 2017 (FIRST); June 25, 2017
Temple explains his and the rest of the Blues and Reds backstories to Dylan and Jax. In the past, the Blues and Reds regularly fought each other repeatedly over each other's bases much like how the Reds and Blues used to do. However, it turned out that the Blue and Red analogue of Grif, Biff, was in fact Temple's childhood friend. They had both enlisted in the UNSC together, and despite their desire to serve together, Project Freelancer forced them on opposite sides of the Red and Blue conflict. One night, Biff confides in Temple that he no longer wants to keep fighting, and asks Temple to shoot him nonlethally so that he can get a medical discharge and return to his girlfriend on Earth. Temple agrees, but the present Temple explains that the plan would not be so simple.
295	13	"Blue vs. Red - Part 2"	June 25, 2017 (FIRST); July 2, 2017
In the past, Carolina and Tex are sent to play Capture the Flag in Desert Gulch, having been assigned by Director Church to lead the Blue and Red teams respectively. Feeling that the assignment is beneath her, Carolina is dismissive of the Blues and easily dispatches the Reds so she can engage Tex directly. Biff believes that this is the perfect time for Temple to help fake an injury so he can get back home. Temple expresses second thoughts when Biff tells him that his girlfriend is expecting a child. Unfortunately, before Temple can do anything else, Biff is caught in the crossfire between Carolina and Tex and ends up fatally impaled by a flag. As Biff died in his arms, Temple swore revenge against Project Freelancer.
296	14	"True Colors"	July 2, 2017 (FIRST); July 9, 2017
Tucker starts becoming suspicious of the Blues and Reds and organizes a secret meeting with the Reds and Blues. They realize that Washington and Carolina have been missing for sometime, and Doc mentions that he saw Dylan tied up in one of the lower levels. The Reds and Blues then confront the Blues and Reds, and Temple admits that he had eliminated Washington and Carolina and plans to take revenge on not just the Freelancers, but the UNSC for creating the project in the first place. Tucker orders his team to put a stop to Temple's plan, but Temple reveals that he has recruited all of the other surviving Red and Blue simulation troopers to fight for him. Temple then gives the Reds and Blues one last chance to join him. Doc accepts, pointing out how Reds and Blues have continually mistreated him in the past. Sarge also joins due to his desire to fight in another war. Tucker, Caboose, Simmons, and Lopez are forced to flee but are quickly cornered. They are forced to stow Lopez's head in a rocket and launch it into space to summon help before they are captured.
297	15	"Objects in Space"	July 9, 2017 (FIRST); July 16, 2017
In a way that parodies the opening title sequence of Star Trek, Lopez's head travels through space until he is picked up by an unknown figure. Meanwhile, Grif is attempting to deal with his isolation after staying behind on the retirement planet, making surrogates of his friends out of volleyballs and learning Spanish out of sheer boredom. Locus then arrives with Lopez's head, telling him his friends need help. Locus offers to help him save the others. Eager to reunite with his friends, Grif agrees to go with him. As they leave the planet, Grif asks Locus why he is helping him, and Locus simply replies that it is the right thing to do.
298	16	"Grif Does A Rescue"	July 16, 2017 (FIRST); July 23, 2017
In anticipation of the assault on the UNSC, Temple promotes Sarge to the rank of "Super Colonel" when he is informed of an intruder. The intruder turns out to be Grif, who quickly gets himself stuck in a vent. Grif is brought to the others in the brig, where Temple taunts them by playing the full transmission Church sent, which was in fact an archived radio message from Alpha-Church to Control asking for a plumber after Caboose and Tucker flushed a grenade down their toilet. Grif then reveals that his capture was in fact a diversion, which Locus takes advantage of when he comes to help Washington and Carolina.
299	17	"Quicksave"	July 23, 2017 (FIRST); July 30, 2017
Locus frees Washington and Carolina from their armor lock, explaining that he had been tracking the Blues and Reds after they stole a vital power generator from an innocent colony, resulting in the deaths of all of the colonists. He also reveals that he is trying to change, so he will refrain from killing anybody. Meanwhile, Sarge is sent to execute Dylan and Jax. However, Sarge has second thoughts and instead saves them, pleading for them to tell the others that working with Temple was in fact all part of a long term plan. Locus and Sarge free the others, with the latter only being accepted back as he apologizes, admitting that he was so desperate to find another battle that he was willing to make his friends into enemies. Simmons and Grif reconcile their friendship, and Grif admits that he is a necessary part of the group. The Reds and Blues then attempt to escape the base and start a battle with the simulation troops. Washington, groggy from the extended armor lock, wanders into the battle and gets shot in the neck.
300	18	"Desolation"	July 30, 2017 (FIRST); August 6, 2017
Angered at Washington being shot, Tucker, Sarge and Caboose defeat the remaining simulation troopers. Locus takes Washington on his ship to get him to a hospital, and advises Tucker to lead the Reds and Blues to pursue Temple. Meanwhile, Dylan consults with one of her scientist contacts, who tells her that the machine Loco built is an unnecessarily over-complicated tunneling machine that can't possibly work. As everybody analyzes the footage Jax had taken and find a map marking a remote island on Earth with no apparent strategic value, Dylan then consults VIC, who found evidence of Temple planning to attack the UNSC's new headquarters on Earth. Dylan eventually concludes that Temple plans to use Loco's machine to tunnel from the island directly through Earth to the UNSC headquarters on the other side. However, Tucker has lost confidence in himself after being fooled by Temple, getting his sword stolen by Buckey, and letting Washington get hurt. After a quick pep talk by Grif, Tucker decides to lead the Reds and Blues against the Blues and Reds.
301	19	"Red vs Red"	August 6, 2017 (FIRST); August 13, 2017
The Reds and Blues arrive at the island, where they are shot down by the island's air defense system, but survive thanks to Grif's piloting. The Reds and Blues then stage a full-on assault on the simulation troopers, easily cutting through their lines, culminating in Cronut and Lorenzo staging a counterattack in a tank, with Tucker kicking off Lorenzo's head and punching the tank until it explodes. During the battle, Dylan's scientist contact calls her back, horrified and panicking. He reveals to Dylan that Loco's machine isn't a tunneling machine; it's a time machine. He further reveals that when the time machine activates, it'll create a singularity that'll destroy the entire planet.
302	20	"Blue vs Blue"	August 13, 2017 (FIRST); August 20, 2017
The Reds and Blues continue to push into the Blues and Reds inner defenses. Sarge encounters Surge, and tries to convince him to turn against Temple, but Surge declines this, and attacks Sarge, who then attempts to spare Surge's life, but accidentally drops him into an incinerator during a monologue. Grif and Simmons encounter Gene, who has switched back to a gold visor, causing him to look exactly like Simmons. Unsure of which Maroon soldier is which, Grif recalls the first episode of the series and asks "Why are we here?" to identify Simmons, allowing Grif to shoot and defeat Gene, who is left dangling over a river of lava. Tucker meanwhile gets into a firefight with Buckey, who runs out of bullets, allowing Tucker to defeat him and reclaim his sword. Blue Team then finds Doc, who tends to an exhausted Carolina after explaining he betrayed the Blues and Reds after discovering their plan. The Reds and Blues finally make it to Temple and the time machine. Temple is defeated by the arrival of Grif, but not before he shoots Loco by accident, mortally wounding him. Loco tells Caboose that he made the door "because friends, best friends, should be able to say goodbye", and as the machine activates, opening a portal to the past, Caboose turns around to find Alpha-Church standing behind him.
303	21	"Epilogues"	August 20, 2017 (FIRST); August 27, 2017
Everyone is shocked to see their friend Church. Loco, dying from his injuries, tells Caboose that he has little time to say goodbye. Tucker tells Caboose to grab Church from the other side of the portal. Caboose refuses, saying Church belongs there and just says his final goodbye to his friend. The machine begins to fire its primary weapon as Dylan inserts VIC into the device. VIC sacrifices himself to shut down the machine, which vanishes. Temple is then knocked out by Tucker under Carolina's wishes. The Reds and Blues then head outside of the facility to find the Chorus lieutenants along with Sister, who was on Chorus for business. They tell the Reds and Blues that Wash was dropped by someone on Chorus, and is recovering under Dr. Grey's supervision. Dylan submits her story, explaining that after spending time with the Reds and Blues, they definitely do not possess the qualities typically associated with heroes. However, it is their friendship with each other and their determination to fight through any challenge that makes them heroic. During the credits, scenes show Temple, Buckey, and Cronut are imprisoned, Jax is pitching a movie based on his adventures to a film studio executive, and Alpha-Church, confused at what he has just witnessed, resolves to completely forget what he has seen and never mention it again.

==== Season 16: The Shisno Paradox (2018) ====
The Reds and Blues venture through the space-time continuum with drastic consequences.

No. Overall	No. in Season	Title	Original release date (Note: Episodes were released to Rooster Teeth FIRST members a week before the general public.)
304	1	"The Shisno"	April 15, 2018
After an opening scene in Medieval England where two knights re-enact the "why are we here" dialogue from the series' first episode, it cuts to right where Season 15 ended. Donut, who had been hit by a bolt shot by a malfunctioning time machine, vanishes in a space-time anomaly, Carolina decides to leave with the Chorus lieutenants to check on Washington's recovery, and Sister rejoins the Reds and Blues as they leave to get pizza. The events turn out to have been watched by two fairy-like light beings, Muggins and Huggins, with the former requesting the latter to follow the group while he leaves to report to their superiors, the Cosmic Powers.
305	2	"Incendiary Incidents"	April 22, 2018
After crashing their ship, Grif explains to Simmons that it was part of his new plan of avoiding everything that will force him into an adventure, something he learned from reading about the "incendiary incidents" of dramatic structure. On the way to the pizzeria, Donut reappears, claiming he has come from the past to tell them that they are to become time travel warriors and defend the universe. Once the restaurant turns out to be destroyed, Donut reveals he has special guns that shoot portals that allow for travel through time and space, and goes back to a week prior, with the restaurant still intact. Before the group can process this, a four-armed goddess calling herself Kalirama descends from the sky and attacks them, blowing up the pizzeria in the process. As Donut summons a force field to protect them, the Reds and Blues split into four groups of two - Caboose and Lopez, Sister and Tucker, Simmons and Sarge, and Doc and Grif, the last of whom are followed by Huggins - and grab the weapons to escape through time travel.
306	3	"Lost Time"	April 29, 2018
As the groups inspect the time-portal guns, Sarge decides to prevent his greatest military failure, only causing it in the process, and Caboose, having misunderstood the "saving the future by fixing the past" message of Donut, decides he will open a fixed interest savings account.
307	4	"Sis and Tuc's Sexellent Adventure"	May 6, 2018
Having disagreed on whether they actually had sex back in Blood Gulch, Sister and Tucker travel back to season 5, with Tucker both causing the death of Captain Flowers by recklessly using a sniper rifle, and the interruption of an attempted intercourse by the past incarnations of Sister and Tucker by startling them with an echoed shout. Sarge concludes the cause of all his problems were incompetent subordinates, and decides to recruit a team of historical warriors. Grif goes back to this pre-army college year and discovers pizza no longer exists, with the pizzeria now selling calzone and stromboli. At Doc's suggestion, he decides to go back in time and ensure pizza is invented.
308	5	"Headshots"	May 13, 2018
With his new recruits, Privates John, George and Alex, Sarge decides he will prevent his defection in the previous season by pre-emptively killing Temple. After they arrive at Desert Gulch just as the Reds and Blues meet their counterparts and Sarge shoots Temple, it turns out to be an actor in a film Jax Jonez is directing based on the events. Jax is at first angry but lets go, being happy at seeing Sarge and Simmons again, noting the Reds and Blues have been missing for a year (which Simmons notes as the amount of time he and Sarge spent time travelling). Seeing an opportunity in the open spot his murder caused, Sarge attempts to convince Jax to cast him as Temple, but only manages to get John, a more experienced actor, in said role. Meanwhile, having heard reports by both Muggins and Kalirama, the king of the Cosmic Powers, Atlus Arcadium Rex, decides that he will exterminate the Reds and Blues.
309	6	"A Pizza the Action"	May 20, 2018
Grif travels to 6th century Italy trying to influence the locals into creating pizza, but his attempts are fruitless. Eventually he decides to give in to Doc's suggestion to instead use time travel to prevent tragedies, only for Doc to be taken over by the O'Malley evil split personality, steal the time gun and leave Grif stranded in the past. In the present, Sister and Tucker, following time travelling misadventures while attempting to have sex with celebrities - Tucker scared the horses of Catherine the Great and Christopher Reeve, crashed Paul Walker's car, and shot Adolf Hitler - get intoxicated on antifreeze just as Muggins announces the arrival of King Atlus, who after being taunted by Tucker and Sister (who mistook him for a hallucination) smites them with lightning.
310	7	"It Just Winked At Me"	May 27, 2018
With Sister and Tucker having survived his attacks due to some sort of divine protection, King Atlus decides to send in after them a huge cyclops (done in live-action and portrayed by Gus Sorola). Following an extensive battle, Tucker defeats the cyclops by striking him in his lone testicle. After Atlus sends in the cyclops's wife, Tucker and Sister run away by opening a portal that leads them to the Medieval England moment that opened the season. Meanwhile, in Ancient Italy, knowing she must stop Doc and get back to the present, Huggins decides to ask for Grif's help.
311	8	"Recovery"	June 3, 2018
In Chorus, Carolina and Washington run a training course, which Carolina hesitates due to his condition but Wash insists. Wash takes a fall, causing him to snap at Carolina for rushing his recovery process, having completely forgotten that it was his idea. Later, Carolina consults Dr. Grey about Wash's frequent memory lapses, in which Dr. Grey explains that Wash is suffering from brain damage due to the injuries he's endured throughout the years. After being contacted by Dylan Andrews, who after discovering ancient art depicting the Reds and Blues has concluded that the group's disappearance had them actually lost in time, Carolina decides to go after Dylan's time travel expert, with Wash tagging along. In Ancient Italy, Grif eventually gives in to Huggins and decides to go with her upon learning that Sister and Tucker are in the same period as them, while still having a time travel gun.
312	9	"Walk and Talk"	June 10, 2018
Carolina and Washington go after the expert, Jax, being greeted in the film set by his new assistant director, Private George. Sarge, who is now an extra in the film, and Simmons reveal to the group that they own a time travel gun, and demonstrate it by opening a portal to their previous week, where Sarge's attempt to recruit Achilles during the Trojan War went wrong. Jax explains the nature of temporal paradoxes, and while trying to demonstrate whether time travel implicates determinism or free will, the group is greeted by Caboose and Lopez. Meanwhile, in the sixth century, Grif and Huggins bond as they walk all the way to England, even if the English Channel is part of the route.
313	10	"Caboose's Travels"	June 17, 2018
Caboose displays a slideshow of his time travels, where he sold a gun to Gavrilo Princip, visited the facility destroyed by Project Freelancer in early season 9, indirectly taught ancient hominids to use tools by beating them with bones, helped Rooster Teeth (referred to as "some ugly people" from Buda, Texas) name their company, caused the classic Maya collapse, and after introducing fire to cavemen, got set ablaze and while running through time torched the library of Alexandria, 1666 London, and the Hindenburg. Washington has painful flashbacks witnessing Jax recreate the moment where he was shot in the neck. In medieval England, Tucker, who was crowned king of Camelot (which he has renamed Camelto) because his sword was mistaken for Excalibur, learns he has a visitor. Grif tells them that O'Malley has returned and all their time travelling is actually doing serious damage, then Donut suddenly appears out of a portal. Donut sees Huggins with Grif and angrily tells them that Huggins is working for the enemy. Grif counters this by saying it is actually Donut who is working for the bad guys and gave them time guns to ruin the past. Donut begs them to listen to him and Tucker questions why they would ever listen to him. Distraught, Donut leaves through a portal. Once Tucker is informed the French army he has declared war on is approaching, he decides to leave with Grif. Donut arrives in a white void dimension, where O'Malley is already waiting, and goes seeing his "God", who tells Donut that his friends will betray him, and that although he will spare them despite that, when Donut returns to the Reds and Blues he must do something for him.
314	11	"Sword Loser"	June 24, 2018
Huggins informs Atlus that the Reds and Blues who just left the sixth century want to have a meeting with him, and while at first he is enraged and unwilling (even using his powers on a moon, that ends up looking like the shattered one seen in RWBY), Atlus begrudgingly accepts at Kalirama's suggestion. During their meeting in a remote island, the Cosmic Powers tell them that they wish to meet with the rest of the Reds and Blues as well. Grif bargains that they would do so if they grant them 3 wishes, Atlus agrees and asks what they wish for. Tucker tries to spend all 3 on getting a 300 foot long penis, but is overruled by Grif who wishes for an energy sword like the one Tucker has. Tucker wastes the second wish getting rid of the sword and Grif wastes the third getting it back. With the "bargaining" over, Atlus tells them to reassemble the rest of the group before they discuss anything further, and congratulate Huggins for her good work. While an ecstatic Grif indulges in sword-related puns, an enraged and frustrated Sister has an argument with Tucker, calling out on his narcissism and need to feel superior.
315	12	"Docudrama"	July 1, 2018
Grif, Sister and Tucker rejoin the rest of the Reds and Blues at Jax's film set. Their talks are covered by a behind-the-scenes documentary in the style of The Office, and once all known information between the group is shared, they leave to meet the Cosmic Powers. Meanwhile, Jax's new cast he recruited through time travel - along with recasting John as Sarge, Rodney Dangerfield is Tucker, Tommy Wiseau is Caboose, and Jeff Bridges is Grif - makes the studio cut off the funding for his movie. Hoping to get a time machine to finish his production, Jax comes through a portal interrupting Atlus's introduction, leading him to get hit by Atlus's thrown hammer. Afterwards, everyone makes their introductions, and Atlus prepares to explain what the Reds and Blues are up against.
316	13	"A Time for Hammers"	July 8, 2018
Atlus reveals that the Cosmic Powers were created by Chrovos and enslaved for a huge project of galactic proportions, although he admits he does not know exactly what said project is. The Cosmic Powers later rebelled against their master and Chrovos sent Titans to stop them, all of which were either killed or imprisoned in a prison-like labyrinth which functions like a never ending treadmill where prisoners walk forward for eternity. Simmons interrupts and says he realized what the Cosmic Powers really are, saying that Chrovos created them to pose as gods to manipulate other races to do his bidding. The Cosmic Powers then reveal themselves as artificial intelligences in Monitor bodies. Atlus continues his story, explaining that in the present Chrovos was weak but not powerless, as he influenced a human to create a time machine and the momentary leak in time gave him enough power to pull someone gullible and stupid enough - Donut - to believe him to the past in the era he was most powerful, where he would then give him Time-Portal Guns to alter the timeline and ruin time itself. With everything the Reds and Blues have done throughout history, they have wrecked time to the brink of collapse. Kalirama tells them the only hope left is for the Reds and Blues to travel to Chrovos' labyrinth, fight their way through its guardians and use a special hammer called The Hammer to reinforce Chrovos' bindings and prevent his escape. In a private room where the Reds and Blues are deciding on whether to undertake this near-impossible task, Washington gives a speech about how the Reds and Blues used time travel for selfish reasons to relive guilt, right wrongs or otherwise fix mistakes when the right thing was to better them now and not dwell on the mistakes of the past and learn and grow from this. The group decide to go through, but Carolina finally speaks up and tells Wash he is not coming because his neck injury led to cerebral hypoxia and brain damage. Wash is angry at the reveal and storms off. Donut steals the Hammer and leaves through a time portal, saying their insults about him being stupid, gullible and worthless made his betrayal easier to accept.
317	14	"Lights Out"	July 15, 2018
After Tucker discusses with Sister about their previous argument and his failures and insecurities, he decides to tell the others his plan to solve things out, going back in time to save Washington from being shot. Huggins, who was spying on them because the Cosmic Powers don't trust them yet, exclaims at this and berates them for this decision saying they will destroy time. They tell her they have no choice and must save their friend. Huggins rushes off with the intent to tell the Cosmic Powers of the Reds and Blues betrayal as Grif sadly bids goodbye to her, and the Reds and Blues decide the rush with their departure. On the way to Atlus, Huggins is intercepted by Genkins, who questions what she is doing, and after she tells him about the Reds and Blues betrayal, he opens a mini black hole which sucks Huggins inside, instantly killing her. Genkins approaches the Cosmic Powers and is soon followed by Muggins who tells them that he felt Huggins energy die and that the Reds and Blues are gone. He concludes that she must have seen the Reds and Blues leave and that someone killed her before she could warn them. Suddenly, three beings, who Atlus calls the Fates, arrive. One of which, named Destiny, prophecies that the end is upon them and no one will live to see the next dawn.
318	15	"Paradox"	July 22, 2018
In Temple's underwater base, the Reds and Blues start their charge to prevent Washington's wound without being detected or causing changes to the past. On the way, Grif smells pizza, and when leaving to investigate the source comes upon Genkins. He reveals, out of boredom, to have erased pizza and caused other events to ensure the Reds and Blues would cause a temporal paradox, as its effects on reality could release Chrovos, who promised to make Genkins an actual god who could rewrite reality to his will. The paradox would be that without Wash's injury, the Reds and Blues reinforced by Wash and Locus would stop Temple from activating the time machine, thereby preventing the incidents that led to the group time travelling in the first place. Meanwhile, at Chrovos's prison, Donut has second thoughts about releasing him with the Hammer, fearing for the safety of his friends, which causes O'Malley to attack. The two soldiers fight across history by jumping through time portals, from which Donut emerges victorious, and decides to use The Hammer to seal Chrovos, who in turn says Donut is too late. At the same time Donut tries striking Chrovos, Grif is unable to prevent the Reds and Blues from shooting down the soldier who shot Wash. The group panics as they fade from existence. Time then returns to a recreation of Blood Gulch in Halo 2 Anniversary. Events similar to the first two episodes of Red vs. Blue occur, only Church has the voice of Genkins and different mannerisms, and Grif and Simmons' "ever wonder why we're here" discussion has them feeling deja vu.

==== Season 17: Singularity (2019) ====
Donut leads the Reds and Blues against Genkins to restore the space-time continuum.

No. Overall	No. in Season	Title	Original release date
319	1	"A Sitch in Time"	March 9, 2019 (FIRST); March 16, 2019
The events of the start of Red vs. Blue are playing again, as the Reds and Blues are trapped in a singularity where they relive their old memories in a loop. However, this time events are going differently due to the intervention of the trickster Genkins, who to release his "grandfather" Chrovos - who at Genkins' request picks a human form, settling on a female body and voice - from a forcefield created by a magical hammer wielded by Donut, is impersonating people from the Reds and Blues' history to change the past and create time paradoxes that cause cracks in said barrier. Once Donut awakens and learns it all from Chrovos, he decides to jump into the singularity, which he nicknames "Everwhen", hoping to break his friends from their trance.
320	2	"Everwhen"	March 16, 2019 (FIRST); March 23, 2019
Donut discovers the nature of the Everwhen, which for being based around his memories means he can possess his past selves. After reliving being shot by Washington at the end of Red vs. Blue: Recreation, Donut unsuccessfully tries to convince the Reds and Blues about their status in moments of seasons 15, 8 and 3. Once Donut is back with Chrovos, her bragging unwittingly gives him the idea to instead discover what happened after the paradox, and Donut goes to Chorus to look for Washington.
321	3	"Schrödingin'"	March 23, 2019 (FIRST); March 30, 2019
By trying to find Washington at General Doyle General Hospital, Donut finds Doctor Emily Grey, who fills him in on the former Freelancer's whereabouts. Wash, who is experiencing the old and new timeline at once, frequently went to the hospital complaining about a non-existing neck wound (because the paradox prevented him from getting shot there), ultimately inspiring Dr. Grey to commit insurance fraud, exaggerating on Wash's medical conditions to the UNSC and getting hefty compensations which built a new wing for the hospital and made Wash rich through unusual business endeavours. Once Donut visits Washington's penthouse, he manages to fix Wash's oscillation between timelines by making him aware he is living through two realities at once, which collapses the probability wave. After Washington catches up on Donut's situation, they go to Chrovos' prison, and Washington has the idea of preventing the paradox, but is unable to do so once Genkins destroys their time portal gun.
322	4	"Breaching the Torus"	March 30, 2019 (FIRST); April 6, 2019
With no other choice, Donut and Washington are forced to use the Time Door to go back into the Everwhen, possess their past selves and attempt to save the Reds and Blues. After Washington learns the mental time travel by going back to when he shot Donut, the duo heads for a briefing in season 13. Washington tells the Reds and Blues about their status trapped in their memories and asks for their help, and is nearly successful if not for the intervention of Genkins - who under the guise of Epsilon, makes Carolina suspicious of Washington and leads him to angrily storm out of the room. Washington and Donut eventually come to the conclusion that their best chance at convincing the Reds and Blues is to exploit how the soldiers are starting to get suspicious of the fake reality, and like Donut "fixed" Wash by making him aware of something impossible, do the same by making Wash meet the soldiers before their actual first encounter. So they travel to season 5, but while Donut is in Blood Gulch, Wash is elsewhere, experiencing the events of the miniseries Recovery One.
323	5	"The Not-So-Good Ol' Days"	April 6, 2019 (FIRST); April 13, 2019
After Washington fully remembers the situation, Wyoming appears. While talking to his would-be adversary, Wash figures out that Genkins would again manipulate Carolina to foil him and Donut, meaning he has to bring her to their side before going to Blood Gulch. Given that during the period Carolina was deemed dead, only resurfacing when she recruited the Reds and Blues to rescue Epsilon, Wash travels back to his Freelancer days trying to discover her whereabouts but since they aren't friends yet, she refuses to talk to him. After several unsuccessful attempts, Washington is advised by Agent Iowa to travel to a more recent time when they are friends and ask her then. He gets the information from her at the time of their retirement during season 15: Carolina enlisted in the UNSC to help end the war somewhere Project Freelancer would never look for her. With the help of the AI Delta, Washington then heads for the base where Carolina served under a fake name, and eventually convinces the suspicious former Freelancer given Wash knew the reasons why she eventually wanted to exact revenge on the Director. Both depart to Blood Gulch.
324	6	"Self-Fulfilling Odyssey"	April 13, 2019 (FIRST); April 20, 2019
Genkins arrives in the same period where Donut and Washington are by impersonating Church. Along with the Pelican airship that had originally arrived in Blood Gulch carrying Grif's sister Kaikaina, another comes in with Wash and Carolina. The Reds and Blues - except for Tucker, who was inside giving birth to Junior at the moment, and Lopez - are confused at recognizing two Freelancers they had never met before, and Carolina also does not understand deeming the simulation troopers familiar. Even though Genkins tries to stop Donut, once he highlights the impossibility of the situation, the group get their minds fixed like it happened with Washington. Washington exposes the identity of a now furious Genkins, who taunts Grif about having done something to his fairy friend Huggins, before Caboose explains he is not taking well his friend Church being impersonated and beats Genkins up until he leaves his body. Afterwards the plot rewinds to when Genkins created a small black hole to suck Huggins within; however, she does not die, and eventually comes across what resembles a red giant star.
325	7	"Limbo"	April 20, 2019 (FIRST); April 27, 2019
Huggins discovers her parents alive, who explain that black holes do not destroy, but lead to the moment prior to the Big Bang, and that the paradox has made time break at a certain point. They also say that by traveling close to the speed of light, Huggins can accelerate time, escape the black hole, and locate the blockage. Back at Blood Gulch, Kaikaina pranks Tucker after he wakes up from his labour-induced coma, until Donut helps Tucker fix his mind - which also works with Doc, who reveals he did not die after fighting Donut in the end of the previous season. Meanwhile, Caboose enters the Singularity and consults with Huggins while the other troopers debate what to do about Donut's betrayal. Doc's encouragement spurs Donut to give a scathing speech about his treatment at the hands of his friends, before storming off. Wash makes the Reds and Blues apologize to Donut so they can fix the timeline.
326	8	"Finally"	April 27, 2019 (FIRST); May 4, 2019
The Reds and Blues attempt to apologize to Donut but the only apology he will accept is them fixing the timeline. Wash and Carolina split off leaving Donut in charge of catching the sim troopers up. He jumps them back ten minutes in the original timeline, where he is trapped under the Pelican and Tucker is back in the base giving birth to Junior. They reunite with Caboose and Huggins, who chastises Grif for messing up the timeline before making up with him. Huggins corrects Donut's plan so that Huggins will scout ahead to note any discrepancies caused by Genkins and report them to Caboose while the Reds and Blues travel to those moments to "re-zip" time. Sarge repeatedly relives the "best day of his life", the deletion of the Blues from the database, while Grif shoots Tex's ship out of the sky when Andy refuses to detonate and Tucker finds himself at the fight on Chorus that ended season 11.
327	9	"Succession"	May 4, 2019 (FIRST); May 11, 2019
Tucker realizes the events that are going wrong are caused by Genkins possessing Lopez Dos.0's Mantis body and turning the tide of the battle the sim troopers originally lost in their favour. Tucker restores the timeline by blowing up Dos.0, and ensuring Sarge, Donut, Wash, and Lopez are knocked out and taken away by the Federal Army. Back at the New Republic base, Genkins occupies Tucker's AI slot and tries to convince the trooper to pre-emptively kill Felix before he betrays everyone, but Tucker talks him down with reflections on the burdens of leadership and how he needs to accomplish what Donut wanted. Donut returns to his first meeting with the Meta, who is possessed by Genkins, and convinces him that Chrovos will betray him. Carolina and Wash discuss their friendship and the necessity of returning to the final paradox: Wash's injury. Genkins convinces Chrovos to give him most of her remaining power, then vows to come destroy her after he's finished with the Reds and Blues. At the site of the final paradox, Wash walks into gunfire to be shot but Genkins freezes time.
328	10	"Killing Time"	May 11, 2019 (FIRST); May 18, 2019
Time resumes and Wash is not shot, allowing Locus to rescue him and turning the tide of the battle with the Blues and Reds. The Reds and Blues are no longer able to jump in time, and Donut has been ejected to Chrovos' prison, but by being trapped at the second iteration of the battle they now have access to a time gun again. They cannot pass through the portals themselves, but light, sound, and objects can go through, allowing them to more-or-less videoconference with Donut. Chrovos, frustrated by Genkins' betrayal, tells them that Genkins can be harmed by the magic golf club given to Caboose by Atlus. They find Genkins at his original paradox, Church's first death, and open a portal in Sheila's barrel, depositing the golf club in it so that it impales him when she fires. Enraged, Genkins brings them all to the Labyrinth, where they are separated and float off into the darkness.
329	11	"Omphalos"	May 18, 2019 (FIRST); May 25, 2019
The Reds and Blues face Labyrinth, an AI who manifests as hallucinations based on their worst insecurities - Wash battles an army of minotaurs who shoot down the entire team, Carolina verbally spars with an image of herself from the Freelancer era, Sarge is miserable in an office environment before finding himself about to storm the beaches of Normandy with great reluctance, Grif is forced by a sadistic instructor to run a deadly obstacle course, and Lopez discovers that he is human and speaking English. Donut watches this from the portal, and asks for Chrovos's help, but she says only his power would be enough. After Genkins is done gloating to Donut and Chrovos and leaves, Doc reveals himself, allowing his and Donut's combined shisno powers to put them in the labyrinth, but not before Lopez can kill himself.
330	12	"Theogeny"	May 25, 2019 (FIRST); June 1, 2019
Doc and Donut rescue Grif, who runs off to save Kai, who was being confronted by a fake Grif in the remains of their burnt down childhood home. Chrovos tries to get Doc to bring out the O'Malley personality, and Doc eventually merges himself and his evil counterpart to save Wash. The gang unites to track down Carolina during her heated battle with her reflection in the Freelancer training room, and Tucker in a nightmare where everyone else was gone. Defeated, Labyrinth reveals himself and partners with them to take down Genkins, whom he beats with the club. Genkins pushes Labyrinth into the black hole and reveals that Lopez is alive since he would have sensed Lopez dying. Donut remembers that by falling into the black hole, Lopez returned to the beginning of time, and because he is inorganic, he can effectively survive into the present. When Donut explains this to Genkins, Genkins realizes that he can become as powerful as Chrovos by jumping into the black hole and gleefully does so. Labyrinth reveals that he was not pushed into the hole and that his and Donut's plan worked: Genkins went back in time and became Chrovos, completing the loop. Free of Genkins, the Reds and Blues erase the original paradox by having Wash injured again. In the hospital, Donut decides to take some time for himself, and Lopez returns having lived through the entirety of the universe.

=== Zero ===
==== Season 18: Zero (2020) ====
No. Overall	No. in Season	Title	Original release date
331	1	"Viper"	November 9, 2020 (FIRST); November 16, 2020
Washington, whose brain damage has been repaired with robotic implants, and Carolina supervise the transfer of an alien artifact to a secure Alliance of Defense facility. The transfer is attacked by the Viper Syndicate of Zero and his subordinates Phase and Diesel, who kill multiple soldiers and defeat Washington and Carolina in hand-to-hand-combat. Meanwhile, Shatter Squad drives back to base after picking up new recruits Raymond. Drivers Agent One and East become competitive and turn it into a race, getting them in trouble with their superior Agent West. However, rather than punish them, he announces they have bigger problems. Back at the base, Phase and Diesel use a mysterious dagger to extract information from Washington while Zero kills the remaining guards and destroys the facility.
332	2	"Recovery"	November 16, 2020 (FIRST); November 23, 2020
Shatter Squad is introduced to Carolina, who is recovering from the injuries sustained battling Viper but decides to test the abilities of One and East by engaging them in hand-to-hand combat. Meanwhile, Zero and Phase use the artifact to open the way to a temple, where they fight several aliens.
333	3	"Duo"	November 23, 2020 (FIRST); November 30, 2020
Zero and Phase fight and defeat a large Temple Guardian, retrieving a large blade from him. At the Alliance of Defense base, One and East briefly get the upper hand on Carolina by fighting in sync, only to lose the advantage once East recklessly charges on Carolina. West and Raymond find a weakened Washington in the lobby and are attacked by Diesel, who only retreats as West fires a rocket launcher on him. Using a new experimental vehicle, Shatter Squad goes after Viper, who broke into another base with an armored truck to steal another artifact.
334	4	"Encounter"	November 30, 2020 (FIRST); December 7, 2020
Shatter Squad continues to chase Viper, with the truck stopping as West rams a Mongoose onto it. However, Zero then knocks out West, and uses the artifacts to successfully beat Shatter Squad one by one. As One tells Carolina that Zero referred to the artifact as a "key", Carolina realizes they have to go save Tucker.
335	5	"Sideways"	December 7, 2020 (FIRST); December 14, 2020
Shatter Squad arrives to save Tucker, who is now an Alliance of Defense instructor, just as Viper arrives to attack him. Tucker is taken to an escape aircraft, and as he talks to an injured East, she in turn stabs him. East carries Tucker's body out and tosses it aside, now in possession of his sword. She then approaches Phase and the two fuse into one person, revealing that East was a "Holo-Echo", a solid hologram that serves as a person's duplicate. Zero notes that now they can open the temple leading to the Ultimate Power.
336	6	"Shattered"	December 14, 2020 (FIRST); December 21, 2020
Tucker turns out to not have died, but the flatline was enough for his sword, the Great Key, to accept working for Phase, who uses it simultaneously with Zero's artifact to open up the final temple. Meanwhile, Axel gives the story of Zero, that used to be "Agent One" for the original Shatter Squad, created by special ops program GLASS during the Great War, and once the project was shut down, Zero felt betrayed and wanted to prove that he was powerful. West in turn reveals that his daughter East, now known as Phase after running away a few years prior and joining Zero, was only saved from a worsening disease by enduring alien experimentation done by Starlight Laboratories. Shatter Squad is not confident in stopping Zero, but One rallies them around to go to battle, which they do after upgrading their armor and weapons.
337	7	"For Power Pt. 1"	December 21, 2020 (FIRST); December 28, 2020
At the Temple, Shatter Squad battles several monsters and a Guardian before meeting Diesel, wielding a Key of his own. Carolina tells the squad to go ahead as she battles Diesel, and on the next part of the temple, Phase appears, who West decides to take on, trying to apologize for all he caused his daughter. One, Axel and Raymond advance to where Zero has used his Key to open the vault to the Ultimate Power - a helmet. The helmet in turn send Zero to a mysterious void, where he meets a figure named "The Black Lotus", Keeper of the Armor, who is convinced by Zero to give him the Ultimate Power. Zero, now wearing the Armor, unleashes his sword and faces the trio, with the Black Lotus speaking through him.
338	8	"For Power Pt. 2"	December 28, 2020 (FIRST); January 4, 2021
After Raymond unlocks armor enhancements that will double their power but cause exhaustion by doubling their energy consumption, One and Axel try to take on Zero. They are eventually joined by Carolina, who killed Diesel and took his Key. As Zero gets pushed back, the Black Lotus mocks his resolve and calls him pathetic for having not yet defeated Shatter Squad even with the help of The Armor. This angers Zero and he proceeds to attack everyone furiously, knocking out Carolina. But before he attacks the rest of Shatter Squad, Phase - who had just defeated and knocked out West - appears to help them. Through coordinated attacks, Zero is defeated, and Black Lotus compliments Shatter Squad on their efforts before teleporting back to his void, dragging Zero along with him. One takes Zero's sword, and calls the Alliance of Defense for rescue, as Shatter Squad, now joined by Phase - who asks to be called by her given name Danielle, while One and Axel reveal themselves as Jamie and Lance - help up Carolina and discuss on possible team-building exercises.

==== Season 19: Family Shatters (2021) ====
Originally released as a non-canon mini-series after the events of Zero, it was retroactively made Season 19 with the release of the Restoration Prologue.

No. Overall	No. in Season	Title	Original release date
339	1	"Shatter Squad Needs a Pet"	October 20, 2021 (FIRST); October 21, 2021
Agents Raymond and One call the team together for a very important meeting to discuss bringing in Shatter Squad’s newest member: a pet.
340	2	"Night of the Living Dad"	October 27, 2021 (FIRST); October 28, 2021
The Squad stages an intervention with spooky results.
341	3	"Walk & Talk"	November 3, 2021 (FIRST); November 4, 2021
Remember when this show was about a bunch of ragtag misfits walking and talking about life’s greatest mysteries?
342	4	"Beach Episode"	November 10, 2021 (FIRST); November 11, 2021
Raymond cooks up a budget-conscious outing for the entire family.
343	5	"Freaky Friday"	November 17, 2021 (FIRST); November 18, 2021
The ever-bickering Phase and East are forced to spend some time in each other’s shoes, literally. Spoiler alert: they hate it.
344	6	"The One With the Escape Room"	November 24, 2021 (FIRST); November 25, 2021
It's exactly what we said it is.
345	7	"Phase's Reputation"	December 1, 2021 (FIRST); December 2, 2021
Please don't start rumors.
346	8	"The Unbearable Lightness of Zero"	December 8, 2021 (FIRST); December 9, 2021
How does a power-hungry megalomaniac start his day? Shatter Squad has a plan to take down Viper, the only question is when to strike!
347	9	"Buzz:Kill"	December 15, 2021 (FIRST); December 16, 2021
Close the door! You're lettin' in bugs!
348	10	"Special Guestmas"	December 22, 2021 (FIRST); December 23, 2021
We wish you a special guestmas!
349	11	"Hard Boiled"	December 29, 2021 (FIRST); December 30, 2021
Murder! Suspense! Intrigue! Breakfast for dinner...

=== Season 20: Restoration (2024) ===
Originally released as a film that concluded the series story, Restoration, was released on May 21, 2024 and was written by Burns and directed by Hullum. On November 16, 2025, it started releasing on the RT site in an episodic format, making it officially season 20. The trailer implies that the events from the Shisno Trilogy and Zero (seasons 15–18 and Family Shatters) have never occurred in the series continuity, only appearing as Epsilon-Church's "simulations" in an attempt to save the Reds and Blues at the end of its thirteenth season.

No. Overall	No. in Season	Title	Original release date
350	1–7	"Restoration"	May 7, 2024
At a film convention, Dylan Andrews hosts a panel featuring Sister that advertises a film adaptation based on the stories of the Reds and Blues when she is attacked by a figure resembling the Meta demanding to know the location of the real Reds and Blues, killing her when she reveals she doesn't know. At an undisclosed location, the remaining members of the Reds and Blues consisting of Caboose, Sarge, Grif and Simmons recover a series of interactive messages left behind by Epsilon in Caboose's helmet prior to his death that Lopez discovered. In these messages, Epsilon reveals that after he fragmented himself to power Tucker's armour during the battle on Malcolm Hargrove's ship, the A.I fragments began to take over Tucker and turn him into the Meta in an attempt for them to become human, similar to the original A.I's plans. However with one A.I missing, that being Epsilon, they remain incomplete in the process. With their memories of the fragmentation gone, the A.I's believe Epsilon to still be alive in possession of Caboose and are hunting him down. This new Meta is not only powered by the A.I's, but also has the intelligence and resources of Charon Industries and their old nemesis Felix, Tucker's intermittent knowledge of the Reds and Blues and their strategies and has Tucker's sword, making him into The Great Destroyer the alien prophecy foretold, who would destroy all of humanity, rather than the aliens themselves like was previously believed. Before his death, Epsilon ran multiple simulations to come up with a way to save the Reds and Blues (resulting in the events depicted in The Shisno Trilogy and Zero) before coming up with a definitive plan to stop the Meta. Seeing all this, the Reds initially refuse to get involved, hoping the Meta will target only Caboose and leave them alone, but ultimately decide to help when they realise they have a better chance of living by helping Caboose. Meanwhile, Tucker attempts to resist the A.I's attempts to convert him into the Meta but is forced into compliance when the fragments of Sigma and Gamma force his brain into a decade's worth of simulated torture. Washington, who was seriously injured during the Charon Battle, recovers in a hospital under the care of Dr. Grey. He receives visits from Doc, who unofficially assists him in psychological recovery. Dr. Grey also briefly mentions that Donut became an admiral. Washington sees a news report on the recent strings of the Meta's attacks and attempts to leave the hospital but he is caught. When he claims he and Doc have witnessed the Meta return, he is deemed insane and locked back into his ward. Through Sheila, the Reds and Blues contact former Project Freelancer pilot, Four Seven Niner, who went into hiding after Project Freelancer was shut down, who transports them to the decommissioned Staff of Charon airship where they hope to obtain the recovery unit that was left onboard during the battle, so they can capture the A.I's inside it and destroy them. Upon arrival, they are attacked by the Meta. The Meta steals the recovery unit before they can use it and overwhelms them with his strength, capturing Caboose and forcing The Reds to retreat. Having a change of heart, Sarge returns to the fight to save Caboose. However, as they retreat to the airship, Sarge is fatally stabbed to by the Meta. As Sarge dies, he promotes Simmons to leader of the Reds, saying that he has been ready to be a leader for a long time now and bequeathing his shotgun to him. Sarge also confesses to Grif that he was always so hard on him because he always knew he had the potential to be better. Back at the hospital on Chorus, Washington manages to escape by sneaking out alongside Doc. Grif, Simmons and Caboose return to Blood Gulch where Grif and Simmons bury Sarge's body. In his first official act as Red Leader, Simmons officially discharges Grif from the military and tells him he's free to leave the army whenever he wants, but when Simmons tells Grif his intention to carry out Sarge's final battle to the end, Grif ultimately decides to stay and help his friends. Meanwhile, Caboose goes to Blue Base to retrieve an unused robot kit, following the instructions of a secret recording left by Epsilon on how to revive him. When he meets up with the Reds that night, he reveals to them Epsilon's plan and the fact he secretly took the memory unit while they were on the Staff of Charon so they can replicate an A.I with the memory unit harvesting their memories. The three soldiers spend the night nostalgically reminiscing on their past misadventures together; however come the next morning, they have failed to replicate the A.I. With the Meta's arrival, Grif and Simmons go to fight the Meta while Caboose tells the memory unit one last story: the story of Alison and Leonard Church, which succeeds in creating the A.I he was hoping for. Washington and Doc arrive to Blood Gulch just in time to see Grif and Simmons try to fight the Meta alone. Still too weakened to help, Washington instead jumps off a cliff to injure himself so his recovery beacon would activate and call for help. The Meta defeats both Grif and Simmons; however before he can kill them, he is intercepted by a revived Agent Texas, whose A.I Caboose had planned to replicate all along. Sigma taunts Tex by saying that she will always fail no matter how hard she tries, but she responds by saying that may have been true for the original Tex, but this Tex is based on the Reds and Blue's memories of her, the one who always wiped the floor with them. Tex struggles to fight the Meta until she is joined by Agent Carolina, who was the one to respond to Washington's recovery beacon. In the ensuing fight, Carolina has her arm broken and is knocked out, leaving Tex about to be killed by the Meta before Simmons steals back the recovery unit from the Meta and throws it to Tex who stabs the Meta with it, trapping all the A.I's inside including herself, freeing Tucker of the Meta's control. With the battle over, Tucker regains consciousness but the trauma of the event causes him to forget everything that has happened since he took the Meta's armour. Caboose destroys the memory unit along with all the A.I's inside, indefinitely putting an end to their adventures, with both him and Carolina coming to terms with the deaths of Church and Tex. In a similar vein, Carolina gets Washington to come to terms with Doc's death; Doc had died during the final battle on Chorus in the Staff of Charon, sacrificing his life to save Washington's when he was seriously wounded. Ever since Washington's hospitalisation, he has been speaking to a hallucination of Doc born from his guilt with Doc's death. Washington and Carolina resolve to overcome their struggles with the memories of their deceased friends and comrades together. Standing on top of Red Base one last time, Grif tells Simmons that although he never figured out why they were here, he's glad that he was "here" with everyone else. Grif officially departs, bidding farewell to Simmons and Caboose, telling Simmons he's always welcome to visit if he ever returns to Earth and telling Caboose that the Blues turned out to be good people in his opinion, halfheartedly apologizing for the "war" they fought each other in. Caboose accepts the apology, saying that the Reds weren't very good at fighting anyway. Grif chuckles and agrees before boarding a transport airship and returns home to Earth, finally leaving the army behind him as he had always wished. A post-credits scene that parodies the one in Ferris Bueller's Day Off features Tucker telling the audience Red vs. Blue is over and ends the movie, the series, and the franchise itself by changing his signature "Bow-Chicka-Bow-Wow" to "Bow-Chicka-Bye-Now."

== Miniseries ==
Canon
Not Canon

Title	Date	Episodes	Notes
Red vs. Blue: Out of Mind	June 16, 2006 – October 3, 2006	5	Set between seasons 4 and 5. Tex chases down Wyoming to find out what O'Malley is planning.
Red vs. Blue: Halo 3 Launch	July 31, 2007 – August 28, 2007	5	Made to promote Halo 3.
Red vs. Blue: Recovery One	October 28, 2007 – December 7, 2007	4	Set immediately after Out of Mind, but released after Season 5. Freelancer Agent Washington investigates a string of Freelancer deaths and theft of their AIs.
Red vs. Blue: Relocated	February 9, 2009 – March 9, 2009	4	Set between seasons 6 and 7. The Reds get acclimated to their new home while Caboose works on a mysterious project.
Red vs. Blue: ODST	September 1, 2009 - September 11, 2009	3	Made to promote Halo 3: ODST.
Red vs. Blue: Holiday Plans	December 31, 2009	3	Originally created for Halo Waypoint, released after Season 7.
The Totally Incredible Legendary Adventures of Team Slipspace	February 20, 2010 - September 16, 2013	13	A spin-off series centered around the members of Team Slipspace. Filmed utilizing the Grifball game type.
Red vs. Blue: Reach	August 9, 2010 - September 8, 2010	3	Made to promote Halo: Reach.
Red vs. Blue: MIA	November 13, 2011 - December 17, 2011	6	Set within the Memory Unit, similar to Season 9. The Reds, with help from the Blues, search for Grif.
Red vs. Blue: Where There's a Will, There's a Wall	April 14, 2012 - April 28, 2012	3	Set within the Memory Unit, similar to Season 9. The Reds deal with a wall behind their base and the Blues get a new shipment.
Red vs. Blue: Chorus Journals	April 4, 2014 - April 25, 2014	4	Set between seasons 11 and 12. The Reds and Blues chronicle the events following Season 11.
Red vs. Blue 360	November 10, 2016 - February 20, 2017	4	Episodes that utilize YouTube's 360º feature.
Red vs. Blue: Halo Recap	April 8, 2022 - May 20, 2022	4	Made to promote the Halo Paramount+ series.
Red vs. Blue: QvsA	August 4, 2022 - December 1, 2022	9	Grif and Simmons answer Internet questions in a series of Halo Infinite shorts.

== Trailers ==
Canon
Not Canon

Title	Date	Notes
Red vs. Blue: The Blood Gulch Chronicles Trailer	September 5, 2002	The first Red vs. Blue video released on the Internet.
Red vs. Blue: Reconstruction Trailer	April 5, 2008	Set days prior to Reconstruction.
Red vs. Blue: Recreation Trailer	June 9, 2009	Set days prior to Recreation.
Red vs Blue: Season 9 Trailer	March 28, 2011	A non-canonical season concept shown at PAX East 2011.
Red vs. Blue: Season 11 Teaser Trailer	May 19, 2013	Set prior to Season 11. Features the voices of Ian Hecox and Anthony Padilla from Smosh.
Red vs. Blue: Season 12 Teaser Trailer	April 1, 2014	Set days prior to Season 12.
Red vs. Blue: Season 13 Trailer	March 6, 2015	Set during the finale of Season 13.
Red vs. Blue: Restoration Prologue	July 7, 2023	The final episode of the series. Set during the finale of Season 13.
