= Limiting magnitude =

Faintest item observable by an instrument

Visual effect of the night sky's brightness on the constellation Orion

In astronomy, limiting magnitude is the faintest apparent magnitude of a celestial body that is detectable or detected by a given instrument.

In some cases, limiting magnitude refers to the upper threshold of detection. In more formal uses, limiting magnitude is specified along with the strength of the signal (e.g., "10th magnitude at 20 sigma"). Sometimes limiting magnitude is qualified by the purpose of the instrument (e.g., "10th magnitude for photometry") This statement recognizes that a photometric detector can detect light far fainter than it can reliably measure.

The limiting magnitude of an instrument is often cited for ideal conditions, but environmental conditions impose further practical limits. These include weather, moonlight, skyglow, and light pollution. DarkSky International has been vocal in championing the cause of reducing skyglow and light pollution.

== Naked-eye visibility ==
The limiting magnitude for naked eye visibility refers to the faintest stars that can be seen with the unaided eye near the zenith on clear moonless nights. The quantity is most often used as an overall indicator of sky brightness, in that light polluted and humid areas generally have brighter limiting magnitudes than remote desert or high altitude areas. The limiting magnitude will depend on the observer, and will increase with the eye's dark adaptation. On a relatively clear sky, the limiting visibility will be about 6th magnitude. However, the limiting visibility is 7th magnitude for faint stars visible from dark rural areas located 200 km (120 mi) from major cities. (See the Bortle scale.)

There is even variation within metropolitan areas. For those who live in the immediate suburbs of New York City, the limiting magnitude might be 4.0. This corresponds to roughly 250 visible stars, or one-tenth of the number that is visible under perfectly dark skies. From the boroughs of New York City outside Manhattan (Brooklyn, Queens, Staten Island, and the Bronx), the limiting magnitude might be 3.0, suggesting that at best, only about 50 stars might be seen at any one time. From brightly lit Midtown Manhattan, the limiting magnitude is possibly 2.0, meaning that from the heart of New York City only about 15 stars will be visible at any given time.

From relatively dark suburban areas, the limiting magnitude is frequently closer to 5 or somewhat fainter, but from very remote and clear sites, some amateur astronomers can see nearly as faint as 8th magnitude. Many basic observing references quote a limiting magnitude of 6, as this is the approximate limit of star maps which date from before the invention of the telescope. Ability in this area, which requires the use of averted vision, varies substantially from observer to observer, with both youth and experience being beneficial.

Limiting magnitude is traditionally estimated by searching for faint stars of known magnitude. In 2013 an app was developed based on Google's Sky Map that allows non-specialists to estimate the limiting magnitude in polluted areas using their phone.

== Modelling magnitude limits ==
We see stars if they have sufficient contrast against the background sky. A star's brightness (more precisely its illuminance) must exceed the sky's surface brightness (i.e. luminance) by a sufficient amount. Earth's sky is never completely black – even in the absence of light pollution there is a natural airglow that limits what can be seen. The astronomer H.D. Curtis reported his naked-eye limit as 6.53, but by looking at stars through a hole in a black screen (i.e. against a totally dark background) was able to see one of magnitude 8.3, and possibly one of 8.9.

Naked-eye magnitude limits can be modelled theoretically using laboratory data on human contrast thresholds at various background brightness levels. Andrew Crumey has done this using data from experiments where subjects viewed artificial light sources under controlled conditions. Crumey showed that for a sky background with surface brightness $\mu_\text{sky} > 21 \,\mathrm{ mag/arcsec^2}$, the visual limit $m$ could be expressed as:
$$m = {0.4260} \mu_\text{sky} - 2.3650 - 2.5 \log F$$
where $F$ is a "field factor" specific to the observer and viewing situation. The very darkest skies have a zenith surface brightness of approximately 22 mag/arcsec^{2}, so it can be seen from the equation that such a sky would be expected to show stars approximately 0.4 mag fainter than one with a surface brightness of 21 mag/arcsec^{2}. Crumey speculated that for most people $F$ will lie between about 1.4 and 2.4, with $F = 2$ being typical. This would imply $m = 6.25$ at the darkest sites, consistent with the traditionally accepted value, though substantially poorer than what is often claimed by modern amateur observers.

To explain the discrepancy, Crumey pointed out that his formula assumed sustained visibility rather than momentary glimpses. He reported that "scintillation can lead to sudden 'flashes' with a brightening of 1 to 2 mag lasting a hundredth of a second." He commented, "The activities of amateur astronomers can lie anywhere between science and recreational sport. If the latter, then the individual's concern with limiting magnitude may be to maximise it, whereas for science a main interest should be consistency of measurement." He recommended that "For the purposes of visibility recommendations aimed at the general public it is preferable to consider typical rather than exceptional performance... Stars should be continuously visible (with direct or averted vision) for some extended period (e.g. at least a second or two) rather than be seen to flash momentarily."

Crumey's formula, stated above, is an approximation to a more general one he obtained in photometric units. He obtained other approximations in astronomical units for skies ranging from moderately light polluted to truly dark.
$$\begin{align}
m &= {0.27} \mu_\text{sky} + 0.8 - 2.5 \log F & (18 < \mu_\text{sky} < 20 \,\mathrm{ mag/arcsec^2}) \\[1ex]
m &= {0.383} \mu_\text{sky} -1.44 - 2.5 \log F & (20 < \mu_\text{sky} < 22 \,\mathrm{ mag/arcsec^2})
\end{align}$$
If an observer knows their own SQM (i.e. sky brightness $\mu_{sky}$ measured by a sky quality meter), and establishes their actual limiting magnitude, they can work out their own $F$ from these formulae. Crumey recommended that for accurate results, the observer should ascertain the V-magnitude of the faintest steadily visible star to one decimal place, and for highest accuracy should also record the colour index and convert to a standard value. Crumey showed that if the limit is $m_c$ at colour index $c$, then the limit at colour index zero is approximately $m_c + 0.27 c$

Some sample values are tabulated below. The general result is that a gain of 1 SQM in sky darkness equates to a gain in magnitude limit of roughly 0.3 to 0.4.

Limiting magnitudes with F = 2
SQM 18.5	SQM 19.5	SQM 20.5	SQM 21.5
5.0	5.3	5.7	6.0

== Visual magnitude limit with a telescope ==
The aperture (or more formally entrance pupil) of a telescope is larger than the human eye pupil, so collects more light, concentrating it at the exit pupil where the observer's own pupil is (usually) placed. The result is increased illuminance – stars are effectively brightened. At the same time, magnification darkens the background sky (i.e. reduces its luminance). Therefore stars normally invisible to the naked eye become visible in the telescope. Further increasing the magnification makes the sky look even darker in the eyepiece, but there is a limit to how far this can be taken. One reason is that as magnification increases, the exit pupil gets smaller, resulting in a poorer image – an effect that can be seen by looking through a small pinhole in daylight. Another reason is that star images are not perfect points of light; atmospheric turbulence creates a blurring effect referred to as seeing. A third reason is that if magnification can be pushed sufficiently high, the sky background will become effectively black, and cannot be darkened any further. This happens at a background surface brightness of approximately 25 mag/arcsec^{2}, where only 'dark light' (neural noise) is perceived. Point sources such as a star will be easier to detect than a diffuse object such as a galaxy or comet.

Various authors have stated the limiting magnitude of a telescope with entrance pupil $D$ centimetres to be of the form
$$m = 5 \log D + N$$
with suggested values for the constant $N$ ranging from 6.8 to 8.7. Crumey obtained a formula for $N$ as a function of the sky surface brightness, telescope magnification, observer's eye pupil diameter and other parameters including the personal factor $F$ discussed above. Choosing parameter values thought typical of normal dark-site observations (e.g. eye pupil 0.7 cm and $F = 2$) he found $N = 7.69$.

Fig. 13 from Crumey (2014). Magnitude limit as a function of sky brightness for a 100mm telescope at various magnifications.

Crumey obtained his formula as an approximation to one he derived in photometric units from his general model of human contrast threshold. As an illustration, he calculated limiting magnitude as a function of sky brightness for a 100mm telescope at magnifications ranging from ×25 to ×200 (with other parameters given typical real-world values). Crumey found that a maximum of 12.7 mag could be achieved if magnification was sufficiently high and the sky sufficiently dark, so that the background in the eyepiece was effectively black. That limit corresponds to $N$ = 7.7 in the formula above.

More generally, for situations where it is possible to raise a telescope's magnification high enough to make the sky background effectively black, the limiting magnitude is approximated by
$$m = 5 \log D + 8 - 2.5 \log (p^2 F / T)$$
where $D$ and $F$ are as stated above, $p$ is the observer's pupil diameter in centimetres, and $T$ is the telescope transmittance (e.g. 0.75 for a typical reflector).

Fig. 14 from Crumey (2014). Magnitude limits determined by I.S. Bowen at Mount Wilson, compared with Crumey's formulae.

Telescopic limiting magnitudes were investigated empirically by I.S. Bowen at Mount Wilson Observatory in 1947, and Crumey was able to use Bowen's data as a test of the theoretical model. Bowen did not record parameters such as his eye pupil diameter, naked-eye magnitude limit, or the extent of light loss in his telescopes; but because he made observations at a range of magnifications using three telescopes (with apertures 0.33 inch, 6 inch and 60 inch), Crumey was able to construct a system of simultaneous equations from which the remaining parameters could be deduced. Because Crumey used astronomical-unit approximations, and plotted on log axes, the limit "curve" for each telescope consisted of three straight sections, corresponding to exit pupil larger than eye pupil, exit pupil smaller, and sky background effectively black. Bowen's anomalous limit at highest magnification with the 60-inch telescope was due to poor seeing. As well as vindicating the theoretical model, Crumey was able to show from this analysis that the sky brightness at the time of Bowen's observations was approximately 21.27 mag/arcsec^{2}, highlighting the rapid growth of light pollution at Mount Wilson in the second half of the twentieth century.

== Large observatories ==
Telescopes at large observatories are typically located at sites selected for dark skies. They also increase the limiting magnitude by using long integration times on the detector, and by using image-processing techniques to increase the signal to noise ratio. Most 8 to 10 meter class telescopes can detect sources with a visual magnitude of about 27 using a one-hour integration time.

Automated astronomical surveys are often limited to around magnitude 20 because of the short exposure time that allows covering a large part of the sky in a night. In a 30 second exposure the 0.7-meter telescope at the Catalina Sky Survey has a limiting magnitude of 19.5. The Zwicky Transient Facility has a limiting magnitude of 20.5, and Pan-STARRS has a limiting magnitude of 24.

Even higher limiting magnitudes can be achieved for telescopes above the Earth's atmosphere, such as the Hubble Space Telescope, where the sky brightness due to the atmosphere is not relevant. For orbital telescopes, the background sky brightness is set by the zodiacal light. The Hubble telescope can detect objects as faint as a magnitude of +31.5, and the James Webb Space Telescope (operating in the infrared spectrum) is expected to exceed that.

== See also ==
- Araucaria Project
- Night sky
- Dark-sky movement
- Ricco's law
