= NGC 1157 =

Galaxy in the constellation Eridanus

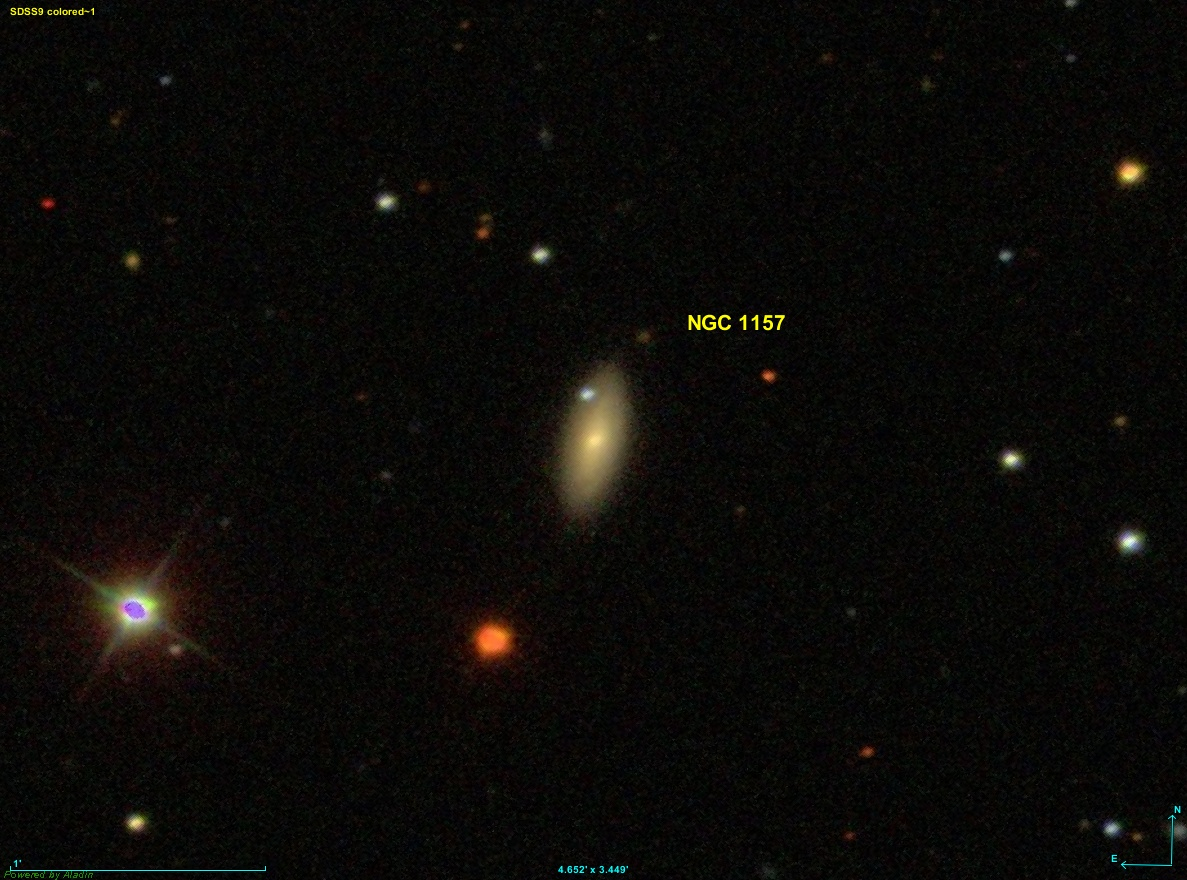

Observation data (J2000 epoch)
- Constellation: Eridanus
- Right ascension: 02^{h} 58^{m} 06.6^{s}
- Declination: −15° 07′ 05″
- Redshift: 0.029544
- Apparent magnitude (V): 14.8

Characteristics
- Type: Sb (Spiral)
- Apparent size (V): 0.6′ × 0.3′

Other designations
- PGC 11218

NGC 1157 is a spiral galaxy located in the constellation Eridanus. It has been classified as an "Sb" type spiral galaxy. The galaxy's redshift (z) of 0.029544 places it at a distance of about 124.8 megaparsecs (407 million light-years) from Earth. NGC 1157 has angular dimensions of 0.60' by 0.3' and is faint, with a visual magnitude of 14.8 and a blue magnitude of 15.6. Its surface brightness is about 12.8 magnitudes per square arcminute. NGC 1157 is also cataloged as PGC 11218.

== Discovery and observation ==
NGC 1157 was first observed by astronomer William Herschel on November 26, 1785. It has since been cataloged in the New General Catalogue (NGC) and is part of a small group of galaxies in the region, including NGC 1155, NGC 1156, NGC 1158, and NGC 1159.

== Nearby galaxies ==
NGC 1157 is located near other galaxies such as NGC 1155, NGC 1156, and NGC 1158. These galaxies are part of the Eridanus constellation and contribute to the galaxy groupings in this region of the sky.
