= De Vries–Rose law =

Principle in vision science

The De Vries–Rose law or Rose–de Vries law is a principle of vision science named after Hessel de Vries and Albert Rose. De Vries discovered it in 1943 from considerations of quantum efficiency, and Rose developed the idea substantially a few years later. The law says that for visual targets seen against a background luminance $B$, subject to certain assumptions, the threshold contrast should be inversely proportional to $\sqrt{B}$ (i.e. contrast sensitivity is directly proportional to $\sqrt{B}$). In reality it holds only approximately, at luminance levels between the regimes of "dark light" and Weber's Law.

== Derivation ==
Suppose that an achromatic target is viewed against a uniform background luminance $B$. For the target to be visible there must be sufficient luminance contrast; i.e. the target must be brighter (or darker) than the background by some amount $\Delta B$. If the target is at threshold (i.e. only just visible, or with some specified probability of detection) then the threshold contrast is defined as $C = \Delta B / B$. If $B$ is in the range of photopic vision, then as $B$ varies we expect $C$ = constant (Weber's law). Suppose instead that $B$ is in the scotopic range, when the quantum nature of light might be significant.

Vision is initiated by a shower of (visible spectrum) photons coming from both target and background to the eye. The photon emission rate will be subject to some probability distribution, so can be taken to lie in the range $(N \pm \delta N)$ where $N$ is the mean of the distribution and $\delta N$ is the standard deviation. Luminance is directly proportional to shower rate over some sufficient time period, so we can write $B = \phi N$, $\Delta B = \phi \Delta N$ for some fixed constant $\phi$ and average rates $N$, $\Delta N$. Then $C = \Delta N /N$.

Photons from the target and background are a visual signal that the observer must discriminate from noise. The likelihood of visibility will be related to the signal to noise ratio. Imagine that the only noise is the variability of the photon shower, and that the eye is an ideal photon detector. Then the least amount of excess brightness required for the target to be visible will be directly proportional to the greatest accuracy with which the photon rate can be measured. So we can write $\Delta N = \rho\delta N$ for some fixed constant $\rho$.

If the photon shower is assumed to obey Poisson statistics, then $\delta N = \sqrt{N}$. Then $\Delta B = \phi \rho \sqrt{N} = \phi \rho \sqrt{B/\phi}$, hence $C \propto 1/\sqrt{B}$.

== Empirical results ==
Threshold increment versus background luminance for various target diameters (in arcmin). Data from tables 4 and 8 of Blackwell (1946), plotted in Crumey (2014).

The law predicts that if log$\Delta B$ is plotted against log$B$, the threshold curve for low $B$ will be a straight line with gradient 1/2, but this is only approximately true in the interval between the very darkest background level (gradient 0 - "dark light"), and daylight conditions (gradient 1 - Weber's law). The portion of approximate validity is termed the De Vries - Rose (or Rose - De Vries) region. Dark light is evidence of neural noise, and Weber's law indicates the presence of a neural gain function. These factors partly account for deviations from the De Vries - Rose law in the intermediate region. The assumption of Poisson statistics places a further limitation on the law's applicability.

Using contrast threshold data collected by H.R. Blackwell, and Knoll et al., Crumey has shown that for targets of angular area $A \leq 10^{-2}$ sr against scotopic backgrounds $B \geq 10^{-5}$ cd m^{−2}, the threshold can be accurately modelled as

$$C = (r_1B^{-1/4}+r_2)^2/A$$

for constants $r_1$, $r_2$. For low $B$ and fixed $A$ this gives the De Vries - Rose law as $C \approx (r_1^2/A)B^{-1/2}$, and for fixed $B$ it gives Ricco's law, $C \propto 1/A$.
