= Four-seam fastball =

Baseball pitch

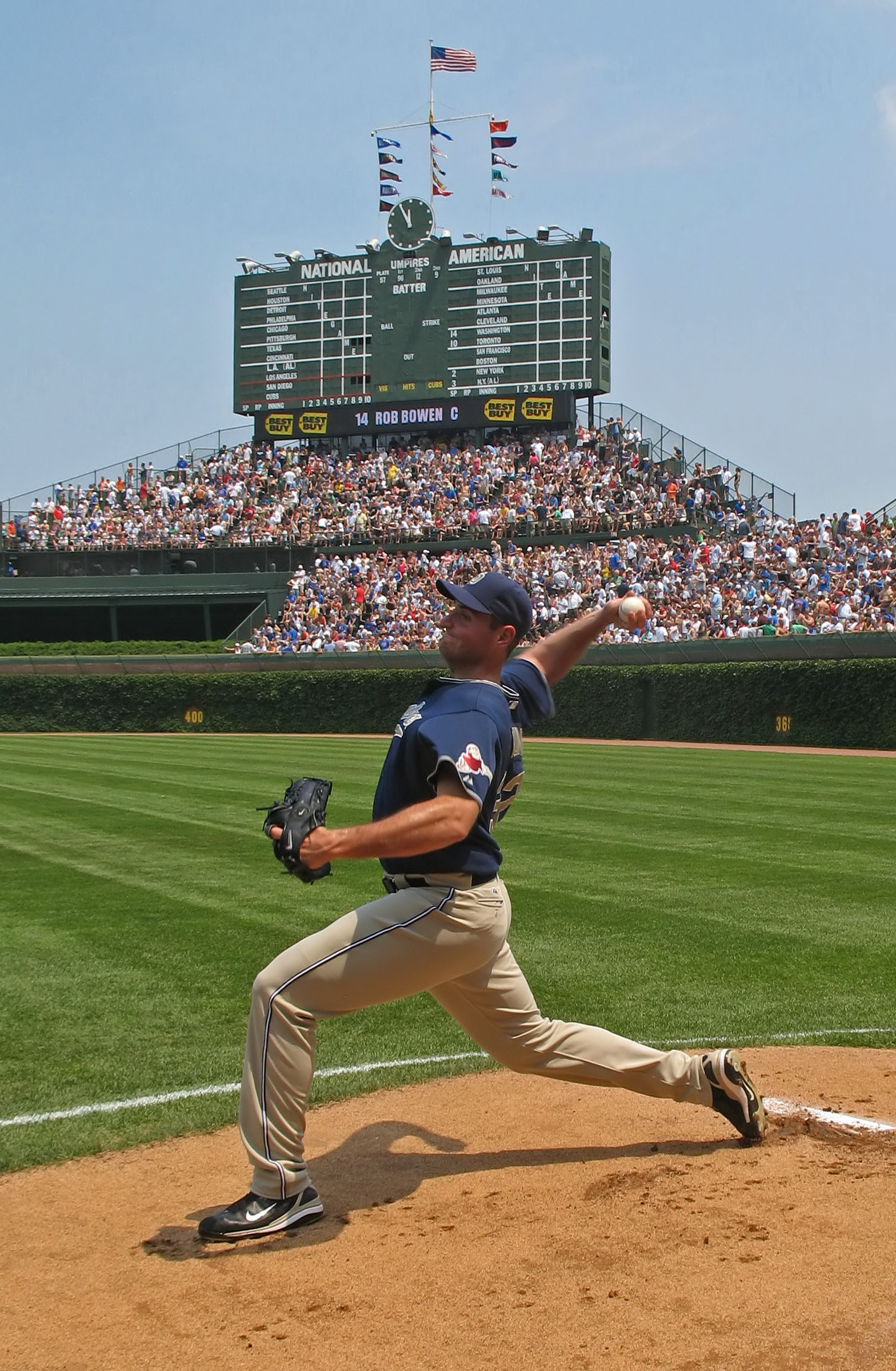
Chris Young with the San Diego Padres throwing a straight-overhead four-seam fastball during a pregame bullpen warmup.

An animated diagram of a four-seam fastball

A four-seam fastball, also called a rising fastball, a four-seamer, or a cross-seam fastball, is a pitch in baseball. It is a member of the fastball family of pitches and is usually the fastest ball thrown by a pitcher. It is so called because with every rotation of the ball as it is thrown, four seams come into view. It is often compared with the two-seam fastball.

== Grip and action ==
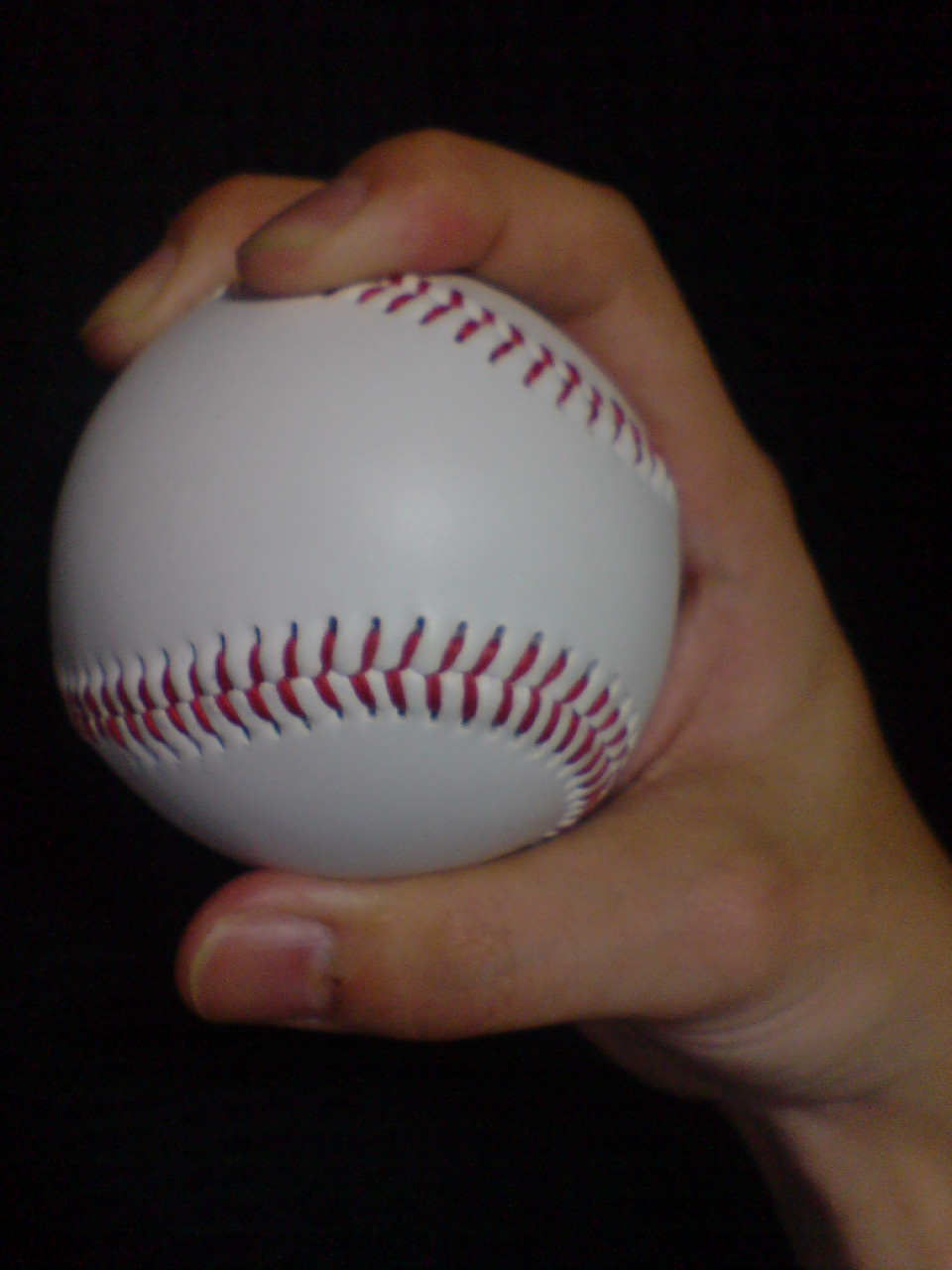
Finger grip on a four-seam fastball

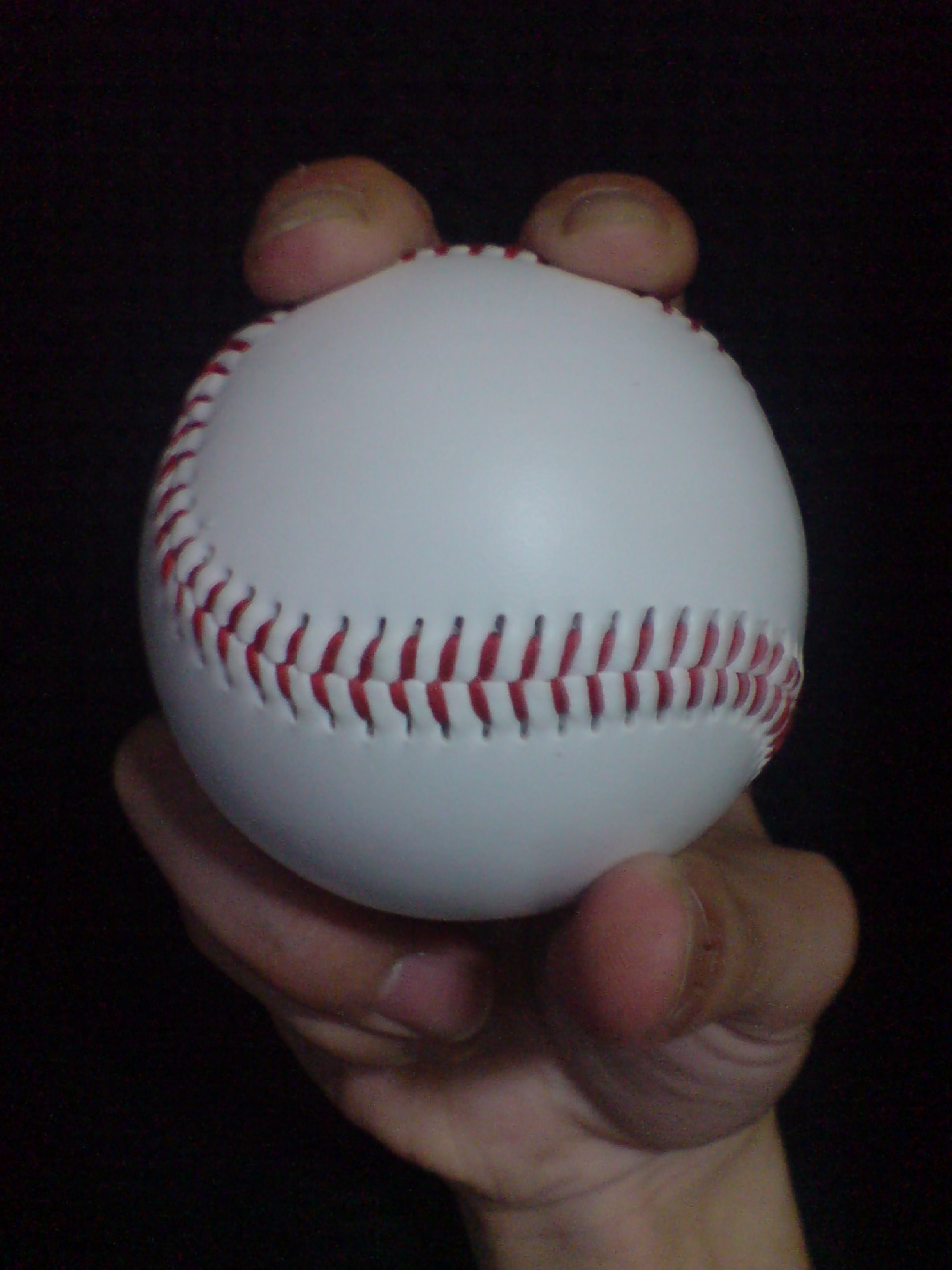
Finger grip on a four-seam fastball

The four-seam fastball is designed purely for velocity; it travels to the batter's box with little or no "break" from straight-line flight—the intent being to challenge the batter's reaction time instead of fooling them with a pitch that breaks downward or to one side or the other. The ball is gripped with the index and middle fingers set on or across a line (cross-seam) of the "horseshoe" seam that faces outward, i.e., away from the pitcher's body. The thumb is placed directly underneath the ball; it rests on smooth leather with the base of the thumb overlaying a seam on the underside of the ball.

The four-seam fastball typically is thrown with a straight overhead swing of the throwing arm. The ball leaves the thumb at the top of the throwing motion as the index and middle fingers play their grip on the "top" seam to roll it down the "back" of the ball, which imparts backspin to the ball that lasts the distance of the pitch. The backspin affects the exchange of momentum between ball and surrounding air such that a lifting force called the Magnus effect offsets the downward pull of gravity on the ball; thus a hard-thrown fastball doesn't drop as much as other types of pitches and may even appear to rise as it approaches the plate. Further, backspin combined with the steady rotation of four seams in alignment with the direction of the pitch stabilizes the ball's flight-path.

A successful four-seam fastball overpowers the batter with velocity, zipping through the strike zone before the batter can timely commit to swing. The faster a four-seamer pitch is accurately thrown, the more effective it will be. It is very difficult for a batter to get "around on" the pitch—to quickly swing the bat around to meet the ball—because they must swing very early to "catch up" to the speedy pitch. One of the most dramatic and frequent scenes in baseball is that of frustrated batters helplessly swinging "empty" on a fastball that has already passed the hitting zone, and frequently, has already made the catcher's mitt.

Conversely, because the four-seamer doesn't break, it is quite hittable by the quick, "good-eye" batter who can "see" where the pitch will arrive. Moreover, its extreme velocity helps experienced batters to hit it extremely hard; that is, if a batter can "square up" on it, a four-seamer pitch can be readily hit for power. Further, a fastball's effectiveness decreases substantially if it is not accurately thrown, i.e., if the pitch is not under control. Due to its straight and level flight an errant fastball will not fool many batters as to its direction; thus, it elicits fewer swings and produces more walks when thrown outside the strike zone. As a pitcher's fastball loses "heat" (speed), more batters will have sufficient time to read and hit the pitch.

Pitching or throwing a fastball comes naturally to most athletes who throw baseballs. The four-seam and two-seam fastballs are typically the first pitches taught to young pitchers. They require very little unnatural motion of the arm, elbow or shoulders, and the ball comes off the fingers easily when the pitch is completed as it is intended to be thrown. The fastball is the most common of pitches, as almost all pitchers throw a fastball as part of their standard repertoire.

Scientific studies have shown that the four-seam and two-seam fastballs have essentially the same flight paths and speeds, but, typically, a batter perceives a difference between them. The perceived difference is due to flicker fusion threshold, which is defined as the frequency that a flashing light appears "steady" to the human eye. For example, for a series of flashed still-pictures to appear steady, the frequency of flashing has to be at a rate greater than the flicker fusion threshold, which for humans is about 60 Hz, or 60 cycles per second.

A major league pitcher throws a baseball with a spin of around 20 rotations per second (rps). With each rotation, a four-seam fastball presents four seams crossing the vision of the batter, producing a flicker rate of 80 Hz, which results in the batter not perceiving any features on the ball and having fewer visual cues than with the two-seamer to track it. Thus, the batter often perceives the four-seam fastball as faster and higher than a two-seam fastball.

== Measuring a four-seam fastball ==
=== Velocity ===
The velocity of a 4-seam fastball is measured in miles per hour (mph) in Major League Baseball. As of 2025, the average velocity of a Major League Baseball pitcher's fastball was 94.0 mph.

=== Spin rate ===
The spin rate of a 4 seam fastball is measured in rotations per minute (rpms) in Major League Baseball.

=== SPV ===
Commonly referred to as “Bauer Units” (slang invented by Driveline Baseball), SPV is defined as Spin Rate per Velocity. This metric allows research to compare the quality of 4 seam fastballs of different pitchers throughout Major League Baseball.

== On the field ==
A four-seam fastball is typically the most preferred throw for fielding as it is the fastest and doesn't stray laterally in the air, according to Harold Reynolds and Kevin Kiermaier.
