= Hessel de Vries =

Dutch physicist (1916–1959)

- Born: November 15, 1916; Annen, Netherlands
- Died: December 23, 1959 (aged 44); Groningen, Netherlands
- Known for: De Vries–Rose law De Vries effect
- Scientific career
- Fields: Radiocarbon dating Vision science
- Institutions: University of Groningen

Hessel de Vries (November 15, 1916 – December 23, 1959), was a Dutch physicist and professor at the University of Groningen who furthered the detection methods and applications of radiocarbon dating to a variety of sciences.

He has been called "the unsung hero of radiocarbon dating" by Eric Willis, the first director of the radiocarbon-dating laboratory at the University of Cambridge. His other major area of research included studies of human color vision and hearing. De Vries became a member of the Royal Netherlands Academy of Arts and Sciences in 1956.

Historian J. J. Engels has noted that De Vries' work could have led to his being awarded the 1960 Nobel Prize in Chemistry alongside Willard Libby, who invented radiocarbon dating; however, the prize is not awarded posthumously, and Hessel de Vries died in Groningen in 1959 by suicide after murdering an analyst, Anneke Hoogeveen.

== Vision science ==
In 1943 De Vries discovered a law of scotopic vision that was further investigated by Albert Rose and is known as the De Vries–Rose law. He investigated the effect of temperature on vision by requiring subjects to sit in hot baths.

== De Vries effect ==
In 1958, de Vries showed that baffling anomalies in the carbon-14 dates, observed by Willard Frank Libby for Egyptological samples, were in fact systematic anomalies on a global scale, represented in the carbon-14 dates of tree rings. This phenomenon has been called the "De Vries effect". The correspondence with tree rings, which can be counted (one ring for each year), led to a recalibration of radiocarbon dating that was a large improvement in the accuracy.

== Murder and suicide ==
De Vries became obsessed with his assistant, Anneke Hoogeveen, and left his wife and children in the hope of being with her. In December 1959 De Vries stabbed her to death with a chisel at her parents' home, then killed himself using cyanide.
