= Flicker fusion threshold =

Concept in the psychophysics of vision

The flicker fusion threshold, also known as critical flicker frequency, flicker modulation threshold, or flicker fusion rate, is the frequency at which a flickering light appears steady to the average human observer. It is a concept studied in vision science, more specifically in the psychophysics of visual perception. The effect was traditionally called "persistence of vision", but that term has also been used to describe positive afterimages and motion blur. Although flicker can be detected for many waveforms representing time-variant fluctuations of intensity, it is conventionally, and most easily, studied in terms of sinusoidal modulation of intensity.

There are seven parameters that determine the ability to detect the flicker:

1. the frequency of the modulation;
2. the amplitude or depth of the modulation (i.e., what is the maximum percent decrease in the illumination intensity from its peak value);
3. the average (or maximum—these can be inter-converted if modulation depth is known) illumination intensity;
4. the wavelength (or wavelength range) of the illumination (this parameter and the illumination intensity can be combined into a single parameter for humans or other animals for which the sensitivities of rods and cones are known as a function of wavelength using the luminous flux function);
5. the position on the retina at which the stimulation occurs (due to the different distribution of photoreceptor types at different positions on the retina);
6. the degree of light or dark adaptation, i.e., the duration and intensity of previous exposure to background light, which affects both the intensity sensitivity and the time resolution of vision;
7. physiological factors such as age, sex, and fatigue.

== Explanation ==
As long as the modulation frequency is kept above the fusion threshold, the perceived intensity can be changed by changing the relative periods of light and darkness. One can prolong the dark periods and thus darken the image; therefore, the effective and average brightness are equal. This is known as the Talbot-Plateau law. Like all psychophysical thresholds, the flicker fusion threshold is a statistical rather than an absolute quantity. There is a range of frequencies within which flicker sometimes will be seen and sometimes will not be seen, and the threshold is the frequency at which flicker is detected on 50% of trials.

Different points in the visual system have very different critical flicker fusion rate (CFF) sensitivities; the overall threshold frequency for perception cannot exceed the slowest of these for a given modulation amplitude. Each cell type integrates signals differently. For example, rod photoreceptor cells, which are exquisitely sensitive and capable of single-photon detection, are very sluggish, with time constants in mammals of about 200 ms. Cones, in contrast, while having much lower intensity sensitivity, have much better time resolution than rods do. For both rod- and cone-mediated vision, the fusion frequency increases as a function of illumination intensity, until it reaches a plateau corresponding to the maximal time resolution for each type of vision. The maximal fusion frequency for rod-mediated vision reaches a plateau at about 15 hertz (Hz), whereas cones reach a plateau, observable only at very high illumination intensities, of about 60 Hz.

In addition to increasing with average illumination intensity, the fusion frequency also increases with the extent of modulation (the maximal relative decrease in light intensity presented); for each frequency and average illumination, there is a characteristic modulation threshold, below which the flicker cannot be detected, and for each modulation depth and average illumination, there is a characteristic frequency threshold. These values vary with the wavelength of illumination, because of the wavelength dependence of photoreceptor sensitivity, and they vary with the position of the illumination within the retina, because of the concentration of cones in central regions including the fovea and the macula, and the dominance of rods in the peripheral regions of the retina.

== Technological considerations ==
=== Display frame rate ===
Flicker fusion is important in all technologies for showing moving images, nearly all of which depend on showing a rapid succession of static images (e.g. the frames in a cinema film, TV show, or a digital video file). If the frame rate falls below the flicker fusion threshold for the given viewing conditions, flicker will be apparent to the observer, and movements of objects on the film will appear jerky. For the purposes of displaying moving images, the human flicker fusion threshold is usually taken between 48 and 60 Hz, though in certain cases it can be higher by an order of magnitude. In practice, movies since the silent era are recorded at either 16 or 24 frames per second and projected by repeating each frame three or two times (respectively) for a flicker of 48 Hz. A television picture typically originates at 50 or 60 frames or interlaced fields per second.

The flicker fusion threshold does not prevent indirect detection of a high frame rate, such as the phantom array effect and wagon-wheel effect, as human-visible side effects of a finite frame rate were still seen on displays refreshing as fast as 480 Hz.

=== Display refresh rate ===
Cathode-ray tube (CRT) displays typically operated at a vertical scan rate of 60 Hz (NTSC) or 50 Hz (PAL/SECAM), the same as SDTV content they displayed, which resulted in noticeable flicker. The same was true of other pulsed technologies such as plasma displays. Modern displays may attempt to alleviate this problem with support for higher refresh rates, from 72 to beyond 300 Hz. However, even if the faster refresh rate is an integer multiple of the source material framerate to eliminate judder, without higher framerate source material, this causes the perception of duplicate images. Any flicker on sample and hold technologies such as LCD or OLED, is unrelated to refresh rate and far less conspicuous, instead coming from incidental design compromises such as fluorescent backlights, PWM dimming, or temporal dithering, all of which are eliminated on some devices that do not flicker at all. Because of the resulting display motion blur inherent to sample-and-hold screens, in applications where accurate motion perception is prioritized over user fatigue, the correct type of flicker can be reintroduced through techniques such as backlight strobing or black frame insertion.

=== Lighting ===
Flicker is also important in the field of domestic (alternating current) lighting, where noticeable flicker can be caused by varying electrical loads, and hence can be very disturbing to electric utility customers. Most electricity providers have maximum flicker limits that they try to meet for domestic customers.

Fluorescent lamps using conventional magnetic ballasts flicker at twice the supply frequency. Electronic ballasts do not produce light flicker since the phosphor persistence is longer than a half cycle of the higher operation frequency of 20 kHz. The 100–120 Hz flicker produced by magnetic ballasts is associated with headaches and eyestrain. Individuals with high critical flicker fusion threshold are particularly affected by light from fluorescent fixtures that have magnetic ballasts: their EEG alpha waves are markedly attenuated and they perform office tasks with greater speed and decreased accuracy. The problems are not observed with electronic ballasts. Ordinary people have better reading performance using high-frequency (20–60 kHz) electronic ballasts than magnetic ballasts, although the effect was small except at high contrast ratio.

The flicker of fluorescent lamps, even with magnetic ballasts, is so rapid that it is unlikely to present a hazard to individuals with epilepsy. Early studies suspected a relationship between the flickering of fluorescent lamps with magnetic ballasts and repetitive movement in autistic children. However, these studies had interpretive problems and have not been replicated.

LED lamps generally do not benefit from flicker attenuation through phosphor persistence, the notable exception being white LEDs. Flicker at frequencies as high as 2,000 Hz can be perceived by humans during saccades, and frequencies above 3,000 Hz have been recommended to avoid human biological effects.

== Visual phenomena ==
In some cases, it is possible to see flicker at rates beyond 2,000 Hz in the case of high-speed eye movements (saccades) or object motion, via the "phantom array" effect. Fast-moving flickering objects zooming across view (either by object motion, or by eye motion such as rolling eyes), can cause a dotted or multicolored blur instead of a continuous blur, as if they were multiple objects. Stroboscopes are sometimes used to induce this effect intentionally. Some special effects, such as certain kinds of electronic glowsticks commonly seen at outdoor events, have the appearance of a solid color when motionless but produce a multicolored or dotted blur when waved about in motion. These are typically LED-based glow sticks. The variation of the duty cycle upon the LED(s), results in usage of less power while by the properties of flicker fusion having the direct effect of varying the brightness. When moved, if the frequency of duty cycle of the driven LED(s) is below the flicker fusion threshold timing differences between the on/off state of the LED(s) becomes evident, and the color(s) appear as evenly spaced points in the peripheral vision.

A related phenomenon is the rainbow effect, where different colors are displayed in different places on the screen for the same object due to fast motion.

=== Flicker ===
Flicker is the perception of visual fluctuations in intensity and unsteadiness in the presence of a light stimulus, as seen by a static observer within a static environment. Flicker that is visible to the human eye will operate at a frequency of up to 80 Hz.

=== Stroboscopic effect ===
The stroboscopic effect is sometimes used to "stop motion" or to study small differences in repetitive motions. The stroboscopic effect refers to the phenomenon that occurs when there is a change in perception of motion, caused by a light stimulus that is seen by a static observer within a dynamic environment. The stroboscopic effect will typically occur within a frequency range between 80 and 2,000 Hz, though it can go well beyond to 10,000 Hz for a percentage of the population.

=== Phantom array ===
Phantom array, also known as the ghosting effect, occurs when there is a change in perception of shapes and spatial positions of objects. The phenomenon is caused by a light stimulus in combination with rapid eye movements (saccades) of an observer in a static environment. Similar to the stroboscopic effect, the phantom effect will also occur at similar frequency ranges. The mouse arrow is a common example of the phantom array effect.

== Non-human species ==
The flicker fusion threshold also varies between species. A 2014 survey of the critical fusion frequency in animals found the lowest value (6.7 Hz) in the cane toad (Bufo marinus) and the highest value (400 Hz) in the black fire beetle (Melanophila acuminate). Estimates for different species of bird vary from 40 to 140 Hz, with higher values tending to be associated with faster-moving species.

If artificial lighting is perceived as flickering by some animals, the aversive effect might be an issue for animal welfare and conservation. However, those animals most liable to perceive flicker tend to be diurnal species active in bright light, and thus least likely to be exposed to artificial lighting outside of captivity. Size and metabolic rate are two further factors associated with the variation in flicker fusion thresholds: small animals with a high metabolic rate tend to have high values.

== See also ==
- Broca-Sulzer effect
- CDR computerized assessment system
- Frame rate
- Persistence of vision
- Refresh rate
- Tweening
