= Broca-Sulzer effect =

Brightness perception variation effect

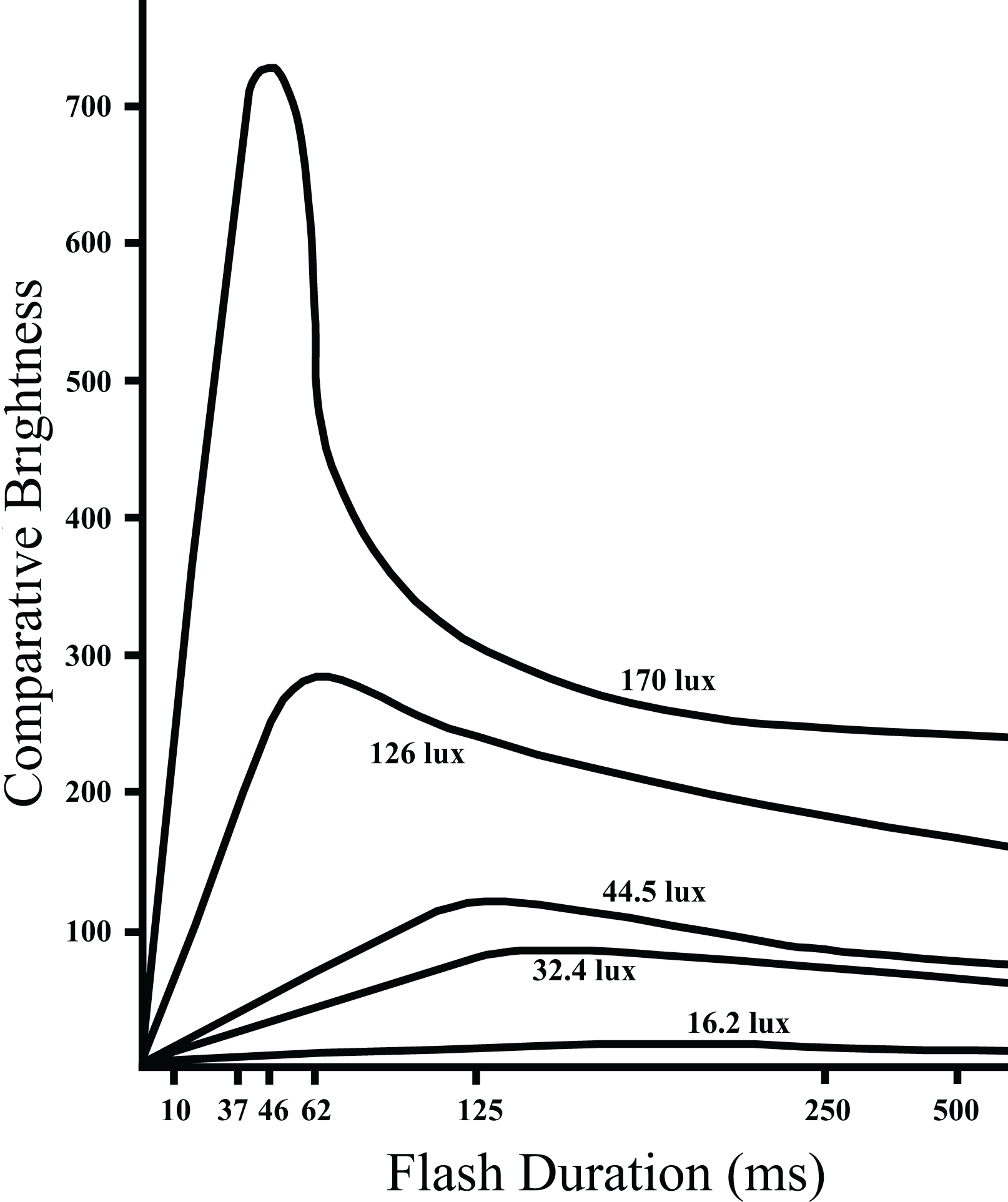
An adaptation of the original figure published by Broca and Sulzer.

The Broca-Sulzer effect or Broca-Sulzer phenomenon is an experimental observation related to the psychophysics of vision. It has two parts, temporal and spatial. In the temporal effect, the perceived brightness of a single flash of light first increases with the flash duration, then reaches a maximum, and decreases for a longer pulse. The maximum is more pronounced and is observed at shorter durations for a stronger illumination; it is reached at approximately 0.1 for a 100 lux flash.

Similarly, in the spatial Broca-Sulzer effect, the perceived brightness increases with increasing angular size of the flashing object until it reaches approximately 2.5 arcminutes, and then decreases for a larger object.

The Broca-Sulzer effect was reported by André Broca and David Émile Sulzer in 1902. It conflicted with the 1885 report by Adolphe-Moïse Bloch who believed that the perceived brightness monotonously increases with the flash duration. Later research showed that while the Bloch's law may hold for some individuals and for some experimental conditions, the Broca-Sulzer effect is a more general phenomenon.

== See also ==
- Talbot-Plateau law
- Bloch's law
