= Talbot-Plateau law =

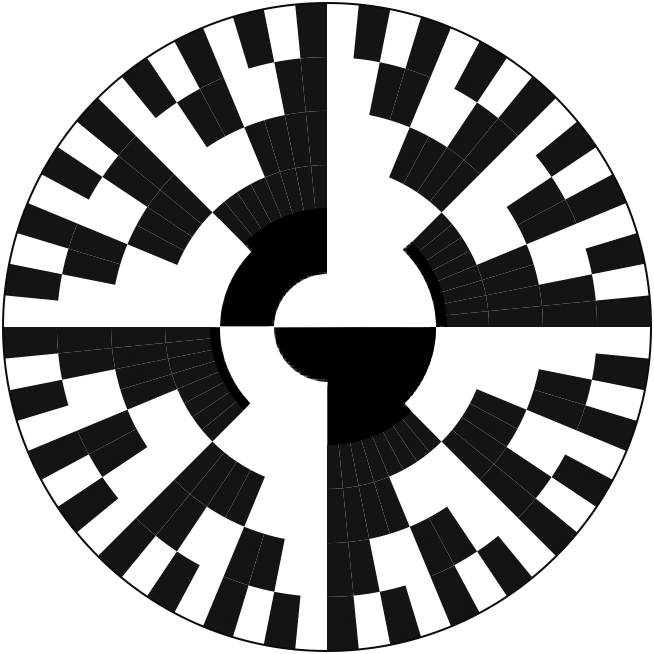
A disk that was used to demonstrate the Talbot-Plateau law. If the disk is rotated fast enough, the black and white bands appear gray.

The Talbot-Plateau law is an experimental observation related to the psychophysics of vision. If a light flickers so rapidly that it appears as continuous, then its perceived brightness will be determined by the relative periods of light and darkness: the longer the darkness, the weaker the light.

The law was first reported in a 1830 article by the Belgian scientist Joseph Plateau. This article stimulated the English photography pioneer Henry Fox Talbot to publish, in 1834, his own observations on this topic made back in the 1820s. While both scientists followed each other's experiments, they maintained that they conceived the original idea independently. In 1863, the experiments of A. Fick suggested that the Talbot-Plateau law does not hold for strong light intensities. This suggestion was later proven by O. Grünbaum in 1898 who demonstrated that flickering strong light appears brighter than its steady state value.

== See also ==
- Broca-Sulzer effect
