= Bloch's law =

Bloch's law observes that, for brief presentations, the product of luminance (or contrast) and duration at the detection threshold is constant. The law is due to Adolphe-Moise Bloch, who first formulated it in 1885.

== Derivation ==
Consider that a brief flash of intensity $I$ is presented for a duration $t$. Bloch's law states that detection occurs if the total luminance energy $I \times t$ exceeds some threshold value $K$. Formally,$I \times t = K$Here, $K$ is a constant that can vary with different viewing conditions, observer attributes, and adaptation levels. Early measurements used single, isolated light flashes of varying duration and intensity to determine the boundary at which a viewer first reports seeing the flash. When plotted against detection thresholds, these data typically exhibit a near-constant product of intensity and duration for short intervals.

== See also ==
- Ricco's law
- Temporal summation
- Contrast (vision)
