= Surface brightness =

Astronomical term for luminosity per area

A scatter plot showing how familiar objects measure in surface brightness (listed here as luminance), apparent magnitude, and angular diameter.

In astronomy, surface brightness (SB) quantifies the apparent brightness or flux density per unit angular area of a spatially extended object such as a galaxy or nebula, or of the night sky background. An object's surface brightness depends on its surface luminosity density, i.e., its luminosity emitted per unit surface area. In visible and infrared astronomy, surface brightness is often quoted on a magnitude scale, in magnitudes per square arcsecond (MPSAS) in a particular filter band or photometric system.

Measurement of the surface brightnesses of celestial objects is called surface photometry.

== General description ==
The total magnitude is a measure of the brightness of an extended object such as a nebula, cluster, galaxy or comet. It can be obtained by summing up the luminosity over the area of the object. Alternatively, a photometer can be used by applying apertures or slits of different sizes of diameter. The background light is then subtracted from the measurement to obtain the total brightness. The resulting magnitude value is the same as a point-like source that is emitting the same amount of energy. The total magnitude of a comet is the combined magnitude of the coma and nucleus.

The apparent magnitude of an astronomical object is generally given as an integrated value—if a galaxy is quoted as having a magnitude of 12.5, it means we see the same total amount of light from the galaxy as we would from a star with magnitude 12.5. However, a star is so small it is effectively a point source in most observations (the largest angular diameter, that of R Doradus, is 0.057 ± 0.005 arcsec), whereas a galaxy may extend over several arcseconds or arcminutes. Therefore, the galaxy will be harder to see than the star against the airglow background light. Apparent magnitude is a good indication of visibility if the object is point-like or small, whereas surface brightness is a better indicator if the object is large. What counts as small or large depends on the specific viewing conditions and follows from Ricco's law. In general, in order to adequately assess an object's visibility one needs to know both parameters.

This is the reason the extreme naked eye limit for viewing a star is apparent magnitude 8, but only apparent magnitude 6.9 for galaxies.

Diffuse objects visible to the naked eye
Object	apmag
Andromeda Galaxy (M31)	3.4
Orion Nebula (M42)	4
Triangulum Galaxy (M33)	5.7
Bode's Galaxy (M81)	6.9

== Calculating surface brightness ==
Surface brightnesses are usually quoted in magnitudes per square arcsecond. Because the magnitude is logarithmic, calculating surface brightness cannot be done by simple division of magnitude by area. Instead, for a source with a total or integrated magnitude m extending over a visual area of A square arcseconds, the surface brightness S is given by
$$S = m + 2.5 \cdot \log_{10} A.$$

For astronomical objects, surface brightness is analogous to photometric luminance and is therefore constant with distance: as an object becomes fainter with distance, it also becomes correspondingly smaller in visual area. In geometrical terms, for a nearby object emitting a given amount of light, radiative flux decreases with the square of the distance to the object, but the physical area corresponding to a given solid angle or visual area (e.g. 1 square arcsecond) decreases by the same proportion, resulting in the same surface brightness. For extended objects such as nebulae or galaxies, this allows the estimation of spatial distance from surface brightness by means of the distance modulus or luminosity distance.

== Relationship to physical units ==
The surface brightness in magnitude units is related to the surface brightness in physical units of solar luminosity per square parsec by
$$S(\mathrm{mag/arcsec^2}) = M_{\odot} + 21.572-2.5\log_{10} S (L_{\odot}/\mathrm{pc}^2),$$
where $M_{\odot}$ and $L_{\odot}$ are the absolute magnitude and the luminosity of the Sun in chosen color-band respectively.

Surface brightness can also be expressed in candela per square metre using the formula [value in cd/m^{2}] = 10.8864×10^{4} × 10^{(−0.4×[value in mag/arcsec^{2}])}.

== Examples ==
A truly dark sky has a surface brightness of 2×10^{−4} cd m^{−2} or 21.8 mag arcsec^{−2}.

The peak surface brightness of the central region of the Orion Nebula is about 17 Mag/arcsec^{2} (about 14 millinits) and the outer bluish glow has a peak surface brightness of 21.3 Mag/arcsec^{2} (about 0.27 millinits).

== See also ==
- Araucaria Project
- Low-surface-brightness galaxy
- Limiting magnitude
- Sigma-D relation
