= Apparent magnitude =

Brightness of a celestial object observed from the Earth

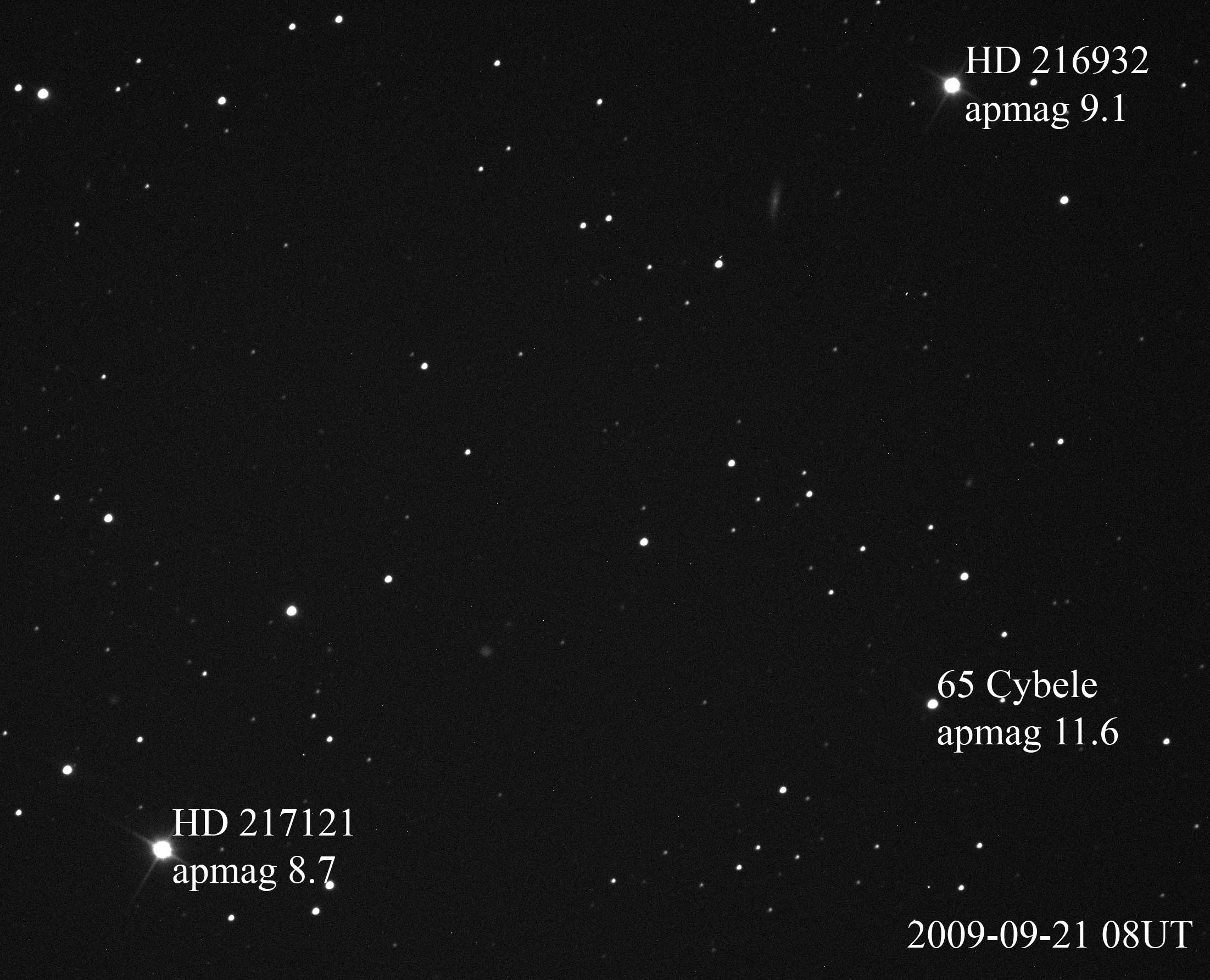
Asteroid 65 Cybele and two stars in the constellation Aquarius, with their magnitudes labeled

Apparent magnitude (m) is a measure of the brightness of a star, astronomical object or other celestial objects like artificial satellites. Its value depends on its intrinsic luminosity, its distance, and any extinction of the object's light caused by interstellar dust or atmosphere along the line of sight to the observer.

Unless stated otherwise, the word magnitude in astronomy usually refers to a celestial object's apparent magnitude. The magnitude scale likely dates to before the ancient Roman astronomer Claudius Ptolemy, whose star catalog popularized the system by listing stars from 1st magnitude (brightest) to 6th magnitude (dimmest). The modern scale was mathematically defined to closely match this historical system by Norman Pogson in 1856.

The scale is reverse logarithmic: the brighter an object is, the lower its magnitude number. A difference of 1.0 in magnitude corresponds to the brightness ratio of $\sqrt[5]{100}$, or about 2.512. For example, a magnitude 2.0 star is 2.512 times as bright as a magnitude 3.0 star, 6.31 times as bright as a magnitude 4.0 star, and precisely 100 times as bright as a magnitude 7.0 star.

The brightest astronomical objects have negative apparent magnitudes, such as Venus at magnitude −4.2 or Sirius at magnitude −1.46. The faintest stars visible with the naked eye on the darkest night have apparent magnitudes of about +6.5, though this varies depending on a person's eyesight, their altitude, and atmospheric conditions when viewing. The apparent magnitude of known objects can range from −26.832 for the Sun to about +31.5 for objects in deep space imaged by the Hubble Space Telescope.

The measurement of apparent magnitude is called photometry. Photometric measurements are made in the ultraviolet, visible, or infrared wavelength bands using standard passband filters belonging to photometric systems such as the UBV system or the Strömgren uvbyβ system. Measurement in the V-band may be referred to as the apparent visual magnitude.

Absolute magnitude is a related quantity which measures the luminosity that a celestial object emits, rather than its apparent brightness when observed, and is expressed on the same reverse logarithmic scale. Absolute magnitude is defined as the apparent magnitude that a star or object would have if it were observed from a distance of 10 parsecs (33 light-years; 3.1×10^{14} kilometres; 1.9×10^{14} miles). Therefore, it is of greater use in stellar astrophysics since it refers to a property of a star regardless of how close it is to Earth. But in observational astronomy and popular stargazing, references to "magnitude" are understood to mean apparent magnitude.

Amateur astronomers commonly express the darkness of the sky in terms of limiting magnitude, i.e. the apparent magnitude of the faintest star they can see with the naked eye. This can be useful as a way of monitoring the spread of light pollution.

Apparent magnitude is technically a measure of illuminance, which can also be measured in photometric units such as lux.

== Number of stars by apparent magnitude ==
The table below, published by the Sunspot Solar Observatory in 1997, lists estimated counts of stars according to their apparent magnitudes. Note that counts for faint-magnitude stars have changed somewhat since the launch of the Hipparcos and Gaia missions during the 20th and 21st centuries respectively.

Visible to typical human eye	Apparent magnitude	Brightness relative to Vega	Number of stars (other than the Sun) brighter than apparent magnitude in the night sky
Yes	−1.0	251%	1 (Sirius)
Yes	0.0	100%	5 (Vega, Canopus, Alpha Centauri, Arcturus)
Yes	1.0	40%	15
Yes	2.0	16%	48
Yes	3.0	6.3%	171
Yes	4.0	2.5%	513
Yes	5.0	1.0%	1602
Yes	6.0	0.4%	4800
Yes	6.5	0.25%	9100
No	7.0	0.16%	14000
No	8.0	0.063%	42000
No	9.0	0.025%	121000
No	10.0	0.010%	340000
No	11.0	0.00398%	927000
No	12.0	0.00158%	2460000
No	13.0	0.000631%	6290000
No	14.0	0.000251%	15500000
No	15.0	0.0001%	36900000
No	16.0	0.0000398%	83700000
No	17.0	0.0000158%	182000000
No	18.0	0.00000631%	374000000
No	19.0	0.00000251%	733000000

For lower magnitudes, the number of stars increases by approximately a factor of 3 for each successive magnitude integer. At higher magnitudes, this goes down to approximately a factor of 2.

== History ==
Limiting magnitudes for visual observation at high magnification
Telescope aperture		Limiting Magnitude
(inches)	(mm)	Limiting Magnitude
1.4	35	11.3
2.4	60	12.3
4	102	13.3
6	152	14.1
8	203	14.7
12	305	15.4
16	406	15.7
20	508	16.4

The scale used to indicate magnitude originates in the Hellenistic practice of dividing stars visible to the naked eye into six magnitudes. The brightest stars in the night sky were said to be of first magnitude (m = 1), whereas the faintest were of sixth magnitude (m = 6), which is the limit of human visual perception (without the aid of a telescope). Each grade of magnitude was considered twice the brightness of the following grade (on a logarithmic scale), although that ratio was subjective as no photodetectors existed. This rather crude scale for the brightness of stars was popularized by Ptolemy in his Almagest and is generally believed to have originated with Hipparchus. This cannot be proved or disproved because Hipparchus's original star catalogue is lost. The only preserved text by Hipparchus himself (a commentary to Aratus) clearly documents that he did not have a system to describe brightness with numbers: He always uses terms like "big" or "small", "bright" or "faint" or even descriptions such as "visible at full moon".

In 1856, Norman Robert Pogson formalized the system by defining a first magnitude star as a star that is 100 times as bright as a sixth-magnitude star, thereby establishing the logarithmic scale still in use today. This implies that a star of magnitude m is about 2.512 times as bright as a star of magnitude m + 1. This figure, the fifth root of 100, became known as Pogson's Ratio. The 1884 Harvard Photometry and 1886 Potsdamer Durchmusterung star catalogs popularized Pogson's ratio, and eventually it became a de facto standard in modern astronomy to describe differences in brightness.

Defining and calibrating what magnitude 0.0 means is difficult, and different types of measurements which detect different kinds of light (possibly by using filters) have different zero points. Pogson's original 1856 paper defined magnitude 6.0 to be the faintest star the unaided eye can see, but the true limit for faintest possible visible star varies depending on the atmosphere and how high a star is in the sky. The Harvard Photometry used an average of 100 stars close to Polaris to define magnitude 5.0. Later, the Johnson UBV photometric system defined multiple types of photometric measurements with different filters, where magnitude 0.0 for each filter is defined to be the average of six stars with the same spectral type as Vega. This was done so the color index of these stars would be 0. Although this system is often called "Vega normalized", Vega is slightly dimmer than the six-star average used to define magnitude 0.0, meaning Vega's magnitude is normalized to 0.03 by definition.

With the modern magnitude systems, brightness is described using Pogson's ratio. In practice, magnitude numbers rarely go above 30 before stars become too faint to detect. While Vega is close to magnitude 0, there are four brighter stars in the night sky at visible wavelengths (and more at infrared wavelengths) as well as the bright planets Venus, Mars, and Jupiter, and since brighter means smaller magnitude, these must be described by negative magnitudes. For example, Sirius, the brightest star of the celestial sphere, has a magnitude of −1.4 in the visible. Negative magnitudes for other very bright astronomical objects can be found in the table below.

Astronomers have developed other photometric zero point systems as alternatives to Vega normalized systems. The most widely used is the AB magnitude system, in which photometric zero points are based on a hypothetical reference spectrum having constant flux per unit frequency interval, rather than using a stellar spectrum or blackbody curve as the reference. The AB magnitude zero point is defined such that an object's AB and Vega-based magnitudes will be approximately equal in the V filter band. However, the AB magnitude system is defined assuming an idealized detector measuring only one wavelength of light, while real detectors accept energy from a range of wavelengths.

== Measurement ==
A scatter plot showing how familiar objects measure in magnitude, surface luminance, and angular diameter.

Precision measurement of magnitude (photometry) requires calibration of the photographic or (usually) electronic detection apparatus. This generally involves contemporaneous observation, under identical conditions, of standard stars whose magnitude using that spectral filter is accurately known. Moreover, as the amount of light actually received by a telescope is reduced due to transmission through the Earth's atmosphere, the airmasses of the target and calibration stars must be taken into account. Typically one would observe a few different stars of known magnitude which are sufficiently similar. Calibrator stars close in the sky to the target are favoured (to avoid large differences in the atmospheric paths). If those stars have somewhat different zenith angles (altitudes) then a correction factor as a function of airmass can be derived and applied to the airmass at the target's position. Such calibration obtains the brightness as would be observed from above the atmosphere, where apparent magnitude is defined.

The apparent magnitude scale in astronomy reflects the received power of stars and not their amplitude. Newcomers should consider using the relative brightness measure in astrophotography to adjust exposure times between stars. Apparent magnitude also integrates over the entire object, regardless of its focus, and this needs to be taken into account when scaling exposure times for objects with significant apparent size, like the Sun, Moon and planets. For example, directly scaling the exposure time from the Moon to the Sun works because they are approximately the same size in the sky. However, scaling the exposure from the Moon to Saturn would result in an overexposure if the image of Saturn takes up a smaller area on your sensor than the Moon did (at the same magnification, or more generally, f/#).

== Calculations ==
Image of 30 Doradus taken by ESO's VISTA. This nebula has a visual magnitude of 8.

Graph of relative brightness versus magnitude

The dimmer an object appears, the higher the numerical value given to its magnitude, with a difference of 5 magnitudes corresponding to a brightness factor of exactly 100. Therefore, the magnitude m, in the spectral band x, would be given by
$$m_{x}= -5 \log_{100} \left(\frac {F_x}{F_{x,0}}\right),$$
which is more commonly expressed in terms of common (base-10) logarithms as
$$m_{x} = -2.5 \log_{10} \left(\frac {F_x}{F_{x,0}}\right),$$
where F_{x} is the observed irradiance using spectral filter x, and F_{x,0} is the reference flux (zero-point) for that photometric filter. Since an increase of 5 magnitudes corresponds to a decrease in brightness by a factor of exactly 100, each magnitude increase implies a decrease in brightness by the factor $\sqrt[5]{100} \approx 2.512$ (Pogson's ratio). Inverting the above formula, a magnitude difference m_{1} − m_{2} = Δm implies a brightness factor of
$$\frac{F_2}{F_1} = 100^\frac{\Delta m}{5} = 10^{0.4 \Delta m} \approx 2.512^{\Delta m}.$$

=== Example: Sun and Moon ===
What is the ratio in brightness between the Sun and the full Moon?

The apparent magnitude of the Sun is −26.832 (brighter), and the mean magnitude of the full moon is −12.74 (dimmer).

Difference in magnitude:
$$x = m_1 - m_2 = (-12.74) - (-26.832) = 14.09.$$

Brightness factor:
$$v_b = 10^{0.4 x} = 10^{0.4 \times 14.09} \approx 432\,513.$$

The Sun appears to be approximately 400000 times as bright as the full Moon.

=== Magnitude addition ===
Sometimes one might wish to add brightness. For example, photometry on closely separated double stars may only be able to produce a measurement of their combined light output. To find the combined magnitude of that double star knowing only the magnitudes of the individual components, this can be done by adding the brightness (in linear units) corresponding to each magnitude.
$$10^{-m_f \times 0.4} = 10^{-m_1 \times 0.4} + 10^{-m_2 \times 0.4}.$$

Solving for $m_f$ yields
$$m_f = -2.5\log_{10} \left(10^{-m_1 \times 0.4} + 10^{-m_2 \times 0.4} \right),$$
where m_{f} is the resulting magnitude after adding the brightnesses referred to by m_{1} and m_{2}.

=== Apparent bolometric magnitude ===
While magnitude generally refers to a measurement in a particular filter band corresponding to some range of wavelengths, the apparent or absolute bolometric magnitude (m_{bol}) is a measure of an object's apparent or absolute brightness integrated over all wavelengths of the electromagnetic spectrum (also known as the object's irradiance or power, respectively). The zero point of the apparent bolometric magnitude scale is based on the International Astronomical Union 2015 Resolution B2, which defines an apparent bolometric magnitude of 0 mag as equivalent to a received irradiance of 2.518×10^{−8} watts per square metre (W·m^{−2}).

=== Absolute magnitude ===
While apparent magnitude is a measure of the brightness of an object as seen by a particular observer, absolute magnitude is a measure of the intrinsic brightness of an object. Flux decreases with distance according to an inverse-square law, so the apparent magnitude of a star depends on both its absolute brightness and its distance (and any extinction). For example, a star at one distance will have the same apparent magnitude as a star four times as bright at twice that distance. In contrast, the intrinsic brightness of an astronomical object, does not depend on the distance of the observer or any extinction.

The absolute magnitude M, of a star or astronomical object is defined as the apparent magnitude it would have as seen from a distance of 10 parsecs (33 ly). The absolute magnitude of the Sun is 4.83 in the V band (visual), 4.68 in the Gaia satellite's G band (green) and 5.48 in the B band (blue).

In the case of a planet or asteroid, the absolute magnitude H rather means the apparent magnitude it would have if it were 1 astronomical unit (150,000,000 km) from both the observer and the Sun, and fully illuminated at maximum opposition (a configuration that is only theoretically achievable, with the observer situated on the surface of the Sun).

== Standard reference values ==
Standard apparent magnitudes and fluxes for typical bands
Band	λ (μm)	Δλ/λ (FWHM)	Flux at m = 0, F_{x,0}	
Band	λ (μm)	Δλ/λ (FWHM)	Jy	10^{−20} erg/(s·cm^{2}·Hz)
U	0.36	0.15	1810	1.81
B	0.44	0.22	4260	4.26
V	0.55	0.16	3640	3.64
R	0.64	0.23	3080	3.08
I	0.79	0.19	2550	2.55
J	1.26	0.16	1600	1.60
H	1.60	0.23	1080	1.08
K	2.22	0.23	670	0.67
L	3.50			
g	0.52	0.14	3730	3.73
r	0.67	0.14	4490	4.49
i	0.79	0.16	4760	4.76
z	0.91	0.13	4810	4.81

The magnitude scale is a reverse logarithmic scale. A common misconception is that the logarithmic nature of the scale is because the human eye itself has a logarithmic response. In Pogson's time this was thought to be true (see Weber–Fechner law), but it is now believed that the response is a power law.

Magnitude is complicated by the fact that light is not monochromatic. The sensitivity of a light detector varies according to the wavelength of the light, and the way it varies depends on the type of light detector. For this reason, it is necessary to specify how the magnitude is measured for the value to be meaningful. For this purpose the UBV system is widely used, in which the magnitude is measured in three different wavelength bands: U (centred at about 350 nm, in the near ultraviolet), B (about 435 nm, in the blue region) and V (about 555 nm, in the middle of the human visual range in daylight). The V band was chosen for spectral purposes and gives magnitudes closely corresponding to those seen by the human eye. When an apparent magnitude is discussed without further qualification, the V magnitude is generally understood.

Because cooler stars, such as red giants and red dwarfs, emit little energy in the blue and UV regions of the spectrum, their power is often under-represented by the UBV scale. Indeed, some L and T class stars have an estimated magnitude of well over 100, because they emit extremely little visible light, but are strongest in infrared.

Measures of magnitude need cautious treatment and it is extremely important to measure like with like. On early 20th century and older orthochromatic (blue-sensitive) photographic film, the relative brightnesses of the blue supergiant Rigel and the red supergiant Betelgeuse irregular variable star (at maximum) are reversed compared to what human eyes perceive, because this archaic film is more sensitive to blue light than it is to red light. Magnitudes obtained from this method are known as photographic magnitudes, and are now considered obsolete.

For objects within the Milky Way with a given absolute magnitude, 5 is added to the apparent magnitude for every tenfold increase in the distance to the object. For objects at very great distances (far beyond the Milky Way), this relationship must be adjusted for redshifts and for non-Euclidean distance measures due to general relativity.

For planets and other Solar System bodies, the apparent magnitude is derived from its phase curve and the distances to the Sun and observer.

== List of apparent magnitudes ==
Some of the listed magnitudes are approximate. Telescope sensitivity depends on observing time, optical bandpass, and interfering light from scattering and airglow.

Apparent visual magnitudes of celestial objects
Apparent magnitude (V)	Object	Seen from...	Notes
−70.97	gamma-ray burst GRB 220101A	seen from 1 AU away	
−70.17	gamma-ray burst GRB 080319B	seen from 1 AU away	This GRB would be over 2×10^{16} (20 quadrillion) times as bright as the Sun when seen from the Earth. It is the most distant object known that was observable with the naked eye.
−56.27	hypernova ASASSN-15lh	seen from 1 AU away	The most luminous hypernova known.
−42.07	star η Carinae A	seen from 1 AU away	
−40.07	star Zeta^{1} Scorpii	seen from 1 AU away	
−39.66	star R136a1	seen from 1 AU away	
−39.49	star Rigel	seen from 1 AU away	would be seen as a large, very bright bluish disk of 35° apparent diameter
−39.47	star P Cygni	seen from 1 AU away	
−30.52 (Note: Calculated from the National Geographic statistic using https://rechneronline.de/log-scale/brightness.php)	Chelyabinsk meteor	seen from Chelyabinsk, Russia on Earth	about 30 times brighter than the Sun at maximum brightness
−30.14	star Sirius A	seen from 1 AU away	
−29.30	star Sun	seen from Mercury at perihelion	
−27.40	star Sun	seen from Venus at perihelion	
−26.83	star Sun	seen from Earth	about 400,000 times as bright as mean full Moon
−25.60	star Sun	seen from Mars at aphelion	
−25	Minimum brightness that causes the typical eye slight pain to look at		
−23.00	star Sun	seen from Jupiter at aphelion	
−21.70	star Sun	seen from Saturn at aphelion	
−21.00	star Sun	seen from Earth on an overcast midday	measuring about 1000 lux
−20.20	star Sun	seen from Uranus at aphelion	
−19.30	star Sun	seen from Neptune	
−19.00	star Sun	seen from Earth on a very strongly overcast midday	measuring about 100 lux
−18.20	star Sun	seen from Pluto at aphelion	
−17.70	planet Earth	seen fully illuminated as earthlight from the Moon	
−17.00	Great Comet of 1882	seen from Earth	brightest comet ever recorded
−16.70	star Sun	seen from Eris at aphelion	
−16.00	star Sun	as twilight on Earth	measuring about 10 lux
−14.2	An illumination level of 1 lux		
−12.60	full moon	seen from Earth at perihelion	maximum brightness of perigee + perihelion + full Moon (~0.267 lux; mean distance value is −12.74, though values are about 0.18 magnitude brighter when including the opposition effect)
−12.40	Betelgeuse (when supernova)	seen from Earth when it goes supernova	
−11.20	star Sun	seen from Sedna at aphelion	
−10.00	Comet Ikeya–Seki (1965)	seen from Earth	brightest Kreutz sungrazer of modern times
−9.50	Iridium (satellite) flare	seen from Earth	maximum brightness
−9 to −10	Phobos (moon)	seen from Mars	maximum brightness
−7.50	supernova of 1006	seen from Earth	the brightest stellar event in recorded history (7200 light-years away)
−6.80	Alpha Centauri A	seen from Proxima Centauri b	
−6.00	The total integrated magnitude of the night sky (incl. airglow)	seen from Earth	measuring about 0.002 lux
−6.00	Crab Supernova of 1054	seen from Earth	(6500 light-years away)
−5.90	International Space Station	seen from Earth	when the ISS is at its perigee and fully lit by the Sun
−4.92	planet Venus	seen from Earth	maximum brightness when illuminated as a crescent
−4.14	planet Venus	seen from Earth	mean brightness
−4	Faintest objects observable during the day with naked eye when Sun is high. An astronomical object casts human-visible shadows when its apparent magnitude is equal to or lower than −4		
−3.99	star Epsilon Canis Majoris	seen from Earth	maximum brightness of 4.7 million years ago, the historical brightest star of the last and next five million years.
−3.69	Moon	reflecting earthlight seen from Earth (maximum)	
−2.98	planet Venus	seen from Earth	minimum brightness during transits
−2.94	planet Jupiter	seen from Earth	maximum brightness
−2.94	planet Mars	seen from Earth	maximum brightness
−2.5	Faintest objects visible during the day with naked eye when Sun is less than 10° above the horizon		
−2.50	new moon	seen from Earth	minimum brightness
−2.50	planet Earth	seen from Mars	maximum brightness
−2.48	planet Mercury	seen from Earth	maximum brightness at superior conjunction (unlike Venus, Mercury is at its brightest when on the far side of the Sun, the reason being their different phase curves)
−2.20	planet Jupiter	seen from Earth	mean brightness
−1.66	planet Jupiter	seen from Earth	minimum brightness
−1.47	star system Sirius	seen from Earth	brightest star except for the Sun at visible wavelengths
−0.83	star Eta Carinae	seen from Earth	apparent brightness as a supernova impostor in April 1843
−0.72	star Canopus	seen from Earth	2nd brightest star in night sky
−0.55	planet Saturn	seen from Earth	maximum brightness near opposition and perihelion when the rings are angled toward Earth
−0.30	Halley's comet	seen from Earth	expected apparent magnitude at 2061 passage
−0.27	star system Alpha Centauri AB	seen from Earth	combined magnitude (3rd brightest star in night sky)
−0.04	star Arcturus	seen from Earth	4th brightest star to the naked eye
−0.01	star Alpha Centauri A	seen from Earth	4th brightest individual star visible telescopically in the night sky
+0.03	star Vega	seen from Earth	originally chosen as a definition of the zero point
+0.13	Large Magellanic Cloud	seen from Earth	
+0.23	planet Mercury	seen from Earth	mean brightness
+0.46	star Sun	seen from Alpha Centauri	
+0.46	planet Saturn	seen from Earth	mean brightness
+0.71	planet Mars	seen from Earth	mean brightness
+0.90	Moon	seen from Mars	maximum brightness
+1.17	planet Saturn	seen from Earth	minimum brightness
+1.33	star Alpha Centauri B	seen from Earth	
+1.86	planet Mars	seen from Earth	minimum brightness
+1.98	star Polaris	seen from Earth	mean brightness
+2.00	star system T CrB (when nova)	seen from Earth	star system that goes nova every 80 years
+2.40	Halley's Comet	seen from Earth	approximate magnitude during 1986 perihelion
+2.7	Small Magellanic Cloud	seen from Earth	
+3	Faintest objects visible in an urban neighborhood with naked eye		
+3.03	supernova SN 1987A	seen from Earth	in the Large Magellanic Cloud (160,000 light-years away)
+3.44	Andromeda Galaxy	seen from Earth	M31
+4	Faintest objects visible in a suburban neighborhood with naked eye		
+4.00	Orion Nebula	seen from Earth	M42
+4.38	moon Ganymede	seen from Earth	maximum brightness (moon of Jupiter and the largest moon in the Solar System)
+4.50	open cluster M41	seen from Earth	an open cluster that may have been seen by Aristotle
+4.50	Sagittarius Dwarf Spheroidal Galaxy	seen from Earth	
+5.20	asteroid Vesta	seen from Earth	maximum brightness
+5.38	planet Uranus	seen from Earth	maximum brightness (Uranus comes to perihelion in 2050)
+5.68	planet Uranus	seen from Earth	mean brightness
+5.72	spiral galaxy M33	seen from Earth	which is used as a test for naked eye seeing under dark skies
+5.80	gamma-ray burst GRB 080319B	seen from Earth	Peak visual magnitude (the "Clarke Event") seen on Earth on 19 March 2008 from a distance of 7.5 billion light-years.
+6.03	planet Uranus	seen from Earth	minimum brightness
+6.49	asteroid Pallas	seen from Earth	maximum brightness
+6.5	Approximate limit of stars observed by a mean naked eye observer under very good conditions. There are about 9,500 stars visible to mag 6.5.		
+6.50	global cluster M2	seen from Earth	mean naked-eye target
+6.64	dwarf planet Ceres	seen from Earth	maximum brightness
+6.75	asteroid Iris	seen from Earth	maximum brightness
+6.90	spiral galaxy M81	seen from Earth	This is an extreme naked-eye target that pushes human eyesight and the Bortle scale to the limit.
+7.25	planet Mercury	seen from Earth	minimum brightness
+7.67	planet Neptune	seen from Earth	maximum brightness (Neptune comes to perihelion in 2042)
+7.78	planet Neptune	seen from Earth	mean brightness
+8	Extreme naked-eye limit, Class 1 on Bortle scale, the darkest skies available on Earth.		
+8.00	planet Neptune	seen from Earth	minimum brightness
+8.10	moon Titan	seen from Earth	maximum brightness; largest moon of Saturn; mean opposition magnitude 8.4
+8.29	star UY Scuti	seen from Earth	maximum brightness; one of largest known stars by radius
+8.94	asteroid 10 Hygiea	seen from Earth	maximum brightness
+9.30	spiral galaxy M63	seen from Earth	
+9.5	Faintest objects visible using common 10×50 binoculars under typical conditions		
+10	Apollo 8 CSM in orbit around the Moon	seen from Earth	calculated (Liemohn)
+10	star system T CrB (average)	seen from Earth	Star system that goes nova every 80 years
+10.20	moon Iapetus	seen from Earth	maximum brightness, brightest when west of Saturn and takes 40 days to switch sides
+11.05	star Proxima Centauri	seen from Earth	closest star (other than the Sun)
+11.8	moon Phobos	seen from Earth	Maximum brightness; brighter moon of Mars
+12.23	star R136a1	seen from Earth	Most luminous and massive star known
+12.89	moon Deimos	seen from Earth	Maximum brightness
+12.91	quasar 3C 273	seen from Earth	brightest (luminosity distance of 2.4 billion light-years)
+13.42	moon Triton	seen from Earth	Maximum brightness
+13.65	dwarf planet Pluto	seen from Earth	maximum brightness, 725 times fainter than magnitude 6.5 naked eye skies
+13.9	moon Titania	seen from Earth	Maximum brightness; brightest moon of Uranus
+14.1	star WR 102	seen from Earth	Hottest known star
+14.6	centaur Chiron	seen from Earth	maximum brightness
+15.55	moon Charon	seen from Earth	maximum brightness (the largest moon of Pluto)
+16.8	dwarf planet Makemake	seen from Earth	Current opposition brightness
+17.7	star WOH G64	seen from Earth	maximum brightness
+17.27	dwarf planet Haumea	seen from Earth	Current opposition brightness
+18.7	dwarf planet Eris	seen from Earth	Current opposition brightness
+19.5	Faintest objects observable with the Catalina Sky Survey 0.7-meter telescope using a 30-second exposure and also the approximate limiting magnitude of Asteroid Terrestrial-impact Last Alert System (ATLAS)		
+20.7	moon Callirrhoe	seen from Earth	(small ≈8 km satellite of Jupiter)
+22	Faintest objects observable in visible light with a 600 mm (24″) Ritchey-Chrétien telescope with 30 minutes of stacked images (6 subframes at 5 minutes each) using a CCD detector		
+22.8	Luhman 16	seen from Earth	Closest brown dwarfs (Luhman 16A=23.25, Luhman 16B=24.07)
+22.91	moon Hydra	seen from Earth	maximum brightness of Pluto's moon
+23.38	moon Nix	seen from Earth	maximum brightness of Pluto's moon
+24	Faintest objects observable with the Pan-STARRS 1.8-meter telescope using a 60-second exposure This is currently the limiting magnitude of automated allsky astronomical surveys.		
+25.0	moon Fenrir	seen from Earth	(small ≈4 km satellite of Saturn) and about 25 million times fainter than what can be seen with the naked eye.
+25.3	Trans-Neptunian object 2018 AG37	seen from Earth	Furthest known observable object in the Solar System about 132 AU (19.7 billion km) from the Sun
+26.2	Trans-Neptunian object 2015 TH367	seen from Earth	200 km sized object about 90 AU (13 billion km) from the Sun and about 75 million times fainter than what can be seen with the naked eye.
+27.7	Faintest objects observable with a single 8-meter class ground-based telescope such as the Subaru Telescope in a 10-hour image		
+28.2	Halley's Comet	seen from Earth (2003)	in 2003 when it was 28 AU (4.2 billion km) from the Sun, imaged using 3 of 4 synchronised individual scopes in the ESO's Very Large Telescope array using a total exposure time of about 9 hours
+28.4	asteroid 2003 BH91	seen from Earth orbit	observed magnitude of ≈15-kilometer Kuiper belt object seen by the Hubble Space Telescope (HST) in 2003, dimmest known directly observed asteroid.
+29.4	galaxy JADES-GS-z13-0	seen from Earth	Discovered by the James Webb Space Telescope. One of the furthest objects discovered. Approximately a billion times fainter than can be observed with the naked eye.
+31.5	Faintest objects observable in visible light with Hubble Space Telescope via the EXtreme Deep Field with ≈23 days of exposure time collected over 10 years		
+35	unnamed asteroid	seen from Earth orbit	expected magnitude of dimmest known asteroid, a 950-meter Kuiper belt object discovered (by the HST) passing in front of a star in 2009.
+35	stars behind the Galactic Center	seen from Earth	expected magnitude at visible wavelengths due to interstellar extinction
≥+100	2M1747	seen from Earth	a red supergiant deeply embedded in a molecular cloud

== See also ==
- Angular diameter
- Distance modulus
- List of nearest bright stars
- List of nearest stars
- Luminosity
- Surface brightness
