= Eigengrau =

Illusionary dark gray color

Threshold increment versus background luminance for various target diameters (in arcmin). Data from tables 4 and 8 of Blackwell (1946), plotted in Crumey (2014). The flat curves at low light indicate Eigengrau.

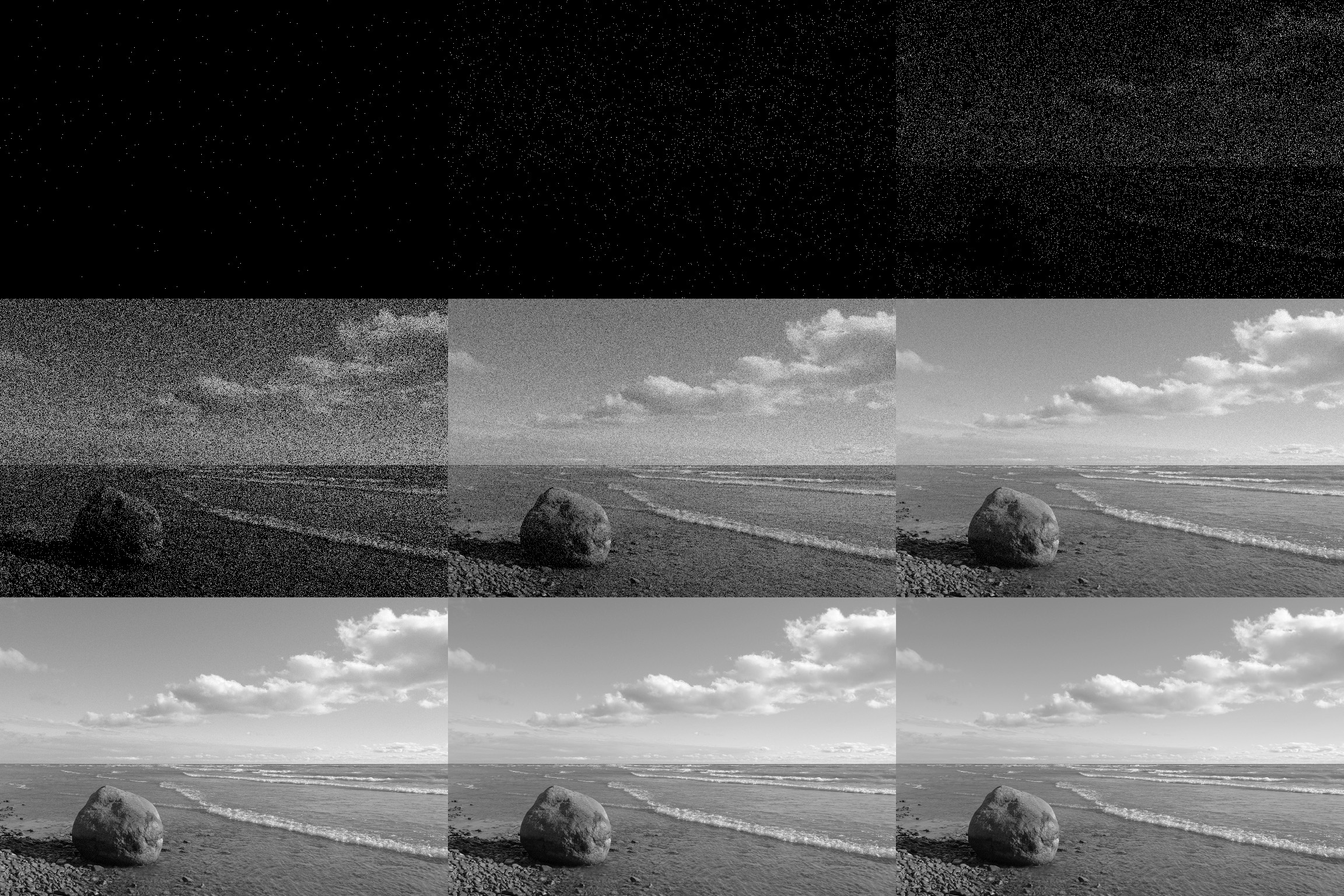
A simulation of photon noise applied to a well-lit base photo

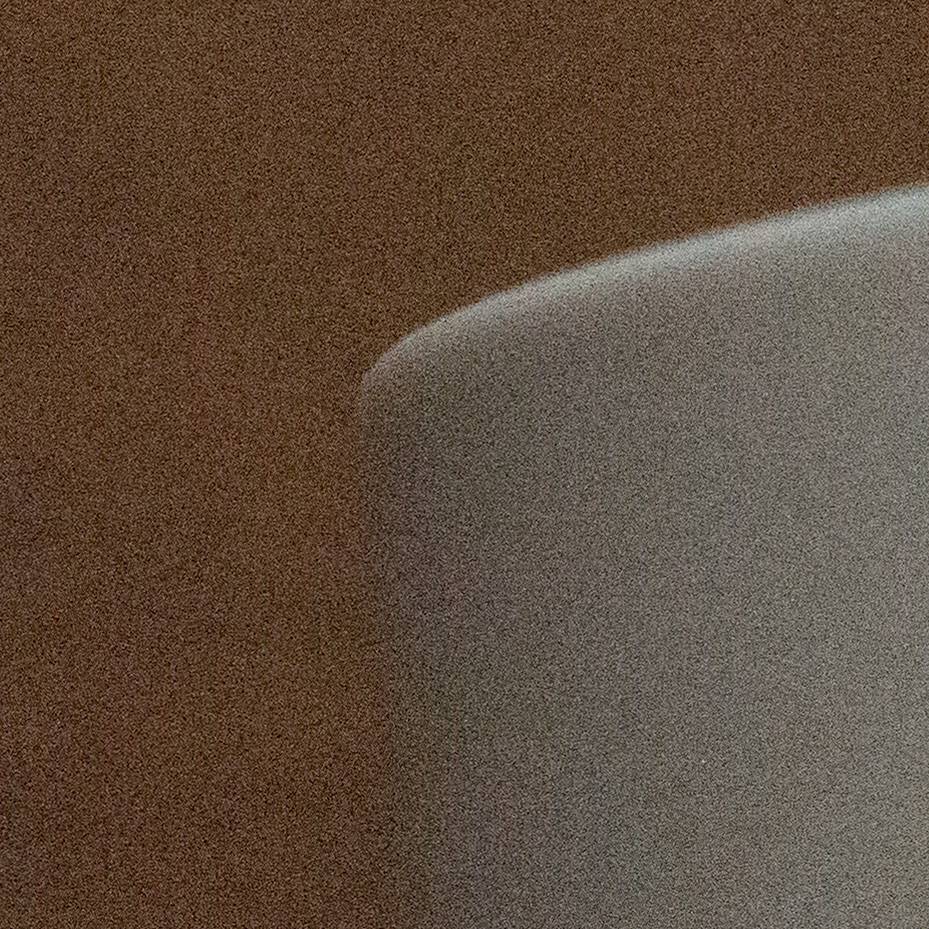
An example of camera noise in low light

Eigengrau (German for 'intrinsic gray'; pronounced [ˈʔaɪ̯gŋ̍ˌgʁaʊ̯]), also called Eigenlicht (Dutch and German for 'intrinsic light'), dark light, or brain gray, is the uniform dark gray background color that many people report seeing in the absence of visible light.

== Background ==
The term Eigenlicht dates back to the nineteenth century, and has rarely been used in recent scientific publications. Common scientific terms for the phenomenon include "visual noise" or "background adaptation". These terms arise due to the perception of an ever-changing field of tiny black and white dots seen in the phenomenon.

Eigengrau is perceived as lighter than a black object in normal lighting conditions because contrast is more important to the visual system than absolute brightness. For example, the night sky looks darker than Eigengrau because of the contrast provided by the stars.

Contrast threshold data, collected by Blackwell and plotted by Crumey, shows Eigengrau occurring at adaptation luminances below approximately 10^{−5} cd m^{−2} (25.08 mag arcsec^{−2}). This is a limiting case of Ricco's law.

== Cause ==
Researchers noticed as early as 1860 that the shape of intensity-sensitivity curves could be explained by assuming that an intrinsic source of noise in the retina produces random events indistinguishable from those triggered by real photons. Later experiments on rod cells of cane toads (Rhinella marina) showed that the frequency of these spontaneous events is strongly temperature-dependent, which implies that they are caused by the thermal isomerization of rhodopsin. In human rod cells, these events occur about once every 100 seconds on average, which, taking into account the number of rhodopsin molecules in a rod cell, implies that the half-life of a rhodopsin molecule is about 420 years. The indistinguishability of dark events from photon responses supports this explanation because rhodopsin is at the input of the transduction chain. On the other hand, processes such as the spontaneous release of neurotransmitters cannot be completely ruled out.

== See also ==
- Closed-eye hallucination
- Impossible color
