= Ricco's law =

Laws of sight

Threshold data from Table 8 of Blackwell (1946) plotted as Figure 4 of Crumey (2014). Curves are for background luminances ranging from 3.426 × 10^{−5} cd m^{−2} (top) to 3.426 × 10^{3} cd m^{−2} (bottom) at intervals of one log unit. The straight dotted sections correspond to Ricco's law.

Riccò's law, discovered by astronomer Annibale Riccò, is one of several laws that describe a human's ability to visually detect targets on a uniform background. It says that for visual targets below a certain size, threshold visibility depends on the area of the target, and hence on the total light received. The "certain size" (called the "critical visual angle"), is small in daylight conditions, larger in low light levels. The law is of special significance in visual astronomy, since it concerns the ability to distinguish between faint point sources (e.g. stars) and small, faint extended objects ("DSOs").

== Derivation ==
Suppose that an achromatic target of angular area $A$ is viewed against a uniform background luminance $B$ (e.g. a disc of white light is projected on a white screen, or a nebula is seen through a telescope). For the target to be visible at all, there must be sufficient luminance contrast; i.e. the target must be brighter (or darker) than the background by some amount $\Delta B$. If the target is at threshold (i.e. only just visible) then the threshold contrast is defined as $C = \Delta B / B$. Riccò's law states that for targets below a certain size, threshold contrast is inversely proportional to target area, i.e. $CA = R$ for some constant $R$. Different values of background luminance $B$ will yield different values of $R$.

This can be seen in contrast threshold data for different levels of background luminance, plotted on a single graph as $\log C$ versus $\log A$. In each case (i.e. for each background $B$), the threshold curve for small targets is a straight line of gradient −1, i.e. $\log C = -\log A + \mathrm{constant}$ $\log (CA) = \mathrm{constant}$

Targets for which the law holds are indistinguishable from point sources. Reading towards the right of each threshold curve, there is a target size at which the law begins to break down, i.e. the slope deviates from -1. This is called the "critical visual angle". It is the size at which targets may begin to be seen as visibly extended (bearing in mind that the threshold data are averaged from multiple observers, and individual performance may vary). Notice that for any background $B$, the threshold curve approaches a slope of zero for large target sizes; i.e. the curve is asymptotic at both ends. The "Ricco area" $A_R$ is conventionally defined by the intersection of the asymptotes. The corresponding visual angle, $2\sqrt {A_R/\pi}$, is larger than the critical visual angle, but better defined, and sufficiently useful as an approximation of the least size at which an object is expected to be seen as clearly extended, for a given background luminance.

== Physical origin ==
Riccò's law is applicable for targets of angular area less than the size of the receptive field. This region is variable based on the amount of background luminance. Riccò's law is based on the fact that within a receptive field, the light energy (or the number of photons per second) required to lead to the target being detected is summed over the area and is thus proportional to the luminance and to the area. Therefore, the contrast threshold required for detection is proportional to the signal-to-noise ratio multiplied by the noise divided by the area. This leads to the above equation.

== Background dependency ==
Figure 5 from Crumey (2014), showing $\sqrt R$ as a function of $B^{-1/4}$

The "constant" R is actually a function of the background luminance B to which the eye is assumed to be adapted. It has been shown by Andrew Crumey that for unconstrained vision (that is, observers could either look directly at the target or avert their gaze) an accurate empirical formula for R is $R = (c_1 B^{-1/4}+c_2)^2$ where c_{1}, c_{2} are constants taking different values for scotopic and photopic vision. For low B this approximates to the De Vries-Rose Law for threshold contrast C $C\equiv\frac{\Delta B}B \propto\frac 1{A\sqrt{B}}.$

However, at very low background luminance (less than 10^{−5} candela per square metre), where the only perception is of 'dark light' (neural noise), the threshold value for the illuminance $\Delta I=A\Delta B$ is a constant (around 10^{−9} lux) and does not depend on B. In that case $C=\frac{\Delta B}B=\frac{\Delta I}{AB}$ or $R=\frac{\Delta I}B.$

At high B such as the daylight sky, Crumey's formula approaches an asymptotic value for R of 5.1×10^{−9} or 5.4×10^{−9} lux per nit. (Note: From coefficients r_{4} or from coefficients a_{3} and a_{5})

== See also ==
- Spatial summation
- Weber's law
- Bloch's law
