= Contrast (vision) =

Visible difference in brightness or color

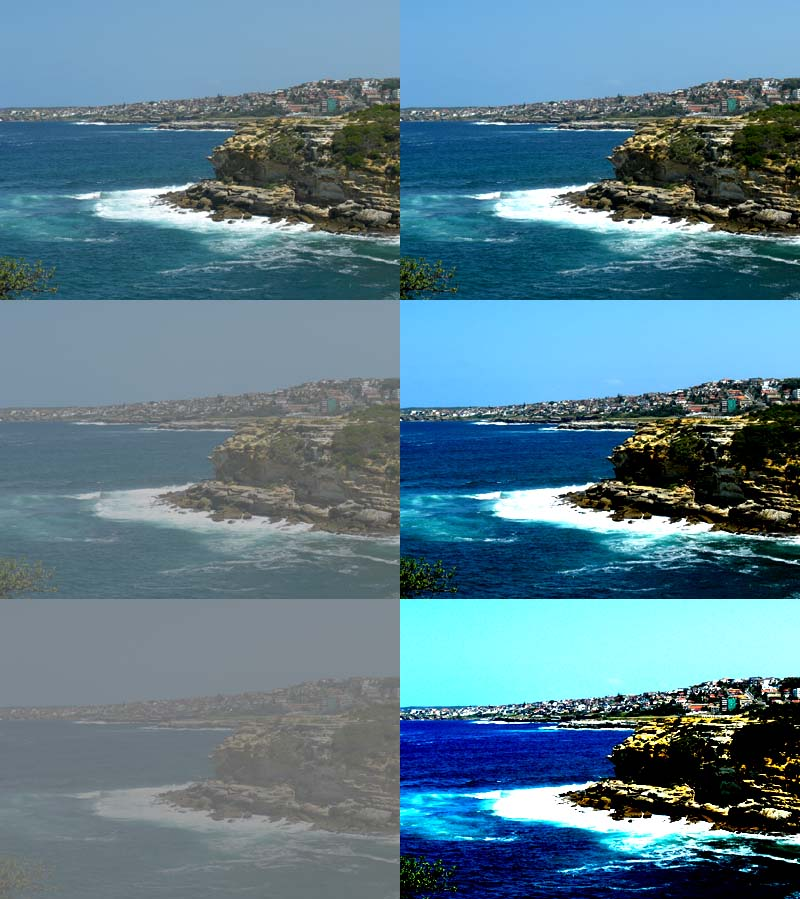
Six renditions of a rocky shore photo with incremental contrast levels, clockwise from bottom left

Contrast is the difference in luminance or color that makes an object (or its representation in an image or display) distinguishable from a background. Human vision is more sensitive to relative differences than to absolute luminance, so perceived appearance can remain fairly stable despite large changes in illumination.

The maximum contrast of an image is termed the contrast ratio or dynamic range. In images where the contrast ratio approaches the maximum possible for the medium, there is a conservation of contrast. In such cases, increasing contrast in certain parts of the image will necessarily result in a decrease in contrast elsewhere. Brightening an image increases contrast in darker areas but decreases it in brighter areas; conversely, darkening the image will have the opposite effect. Bleach bypass reduces contrast in the darkest and brightest parts of an image while enhancing luminance contrast in areas of intermediate brightness.

== Biological contrast sensitivity ==
Campbell and Robson (1968) showed that the typical human contrast sensitivity function displays a band-pass filter shape that peaks around 4 cycles per degree (cpd or cyc/deg), with sensitivity dropping off either side of the peak. This can be observed by changing one's viewing distance from a "sweep grating" (shown below) showing many bars of a sinusoidal grating that go from high to low contrast along the bars, and go from narrow (high spatial frequency) to wide (low spatial frequency) bars across the width of the grating.

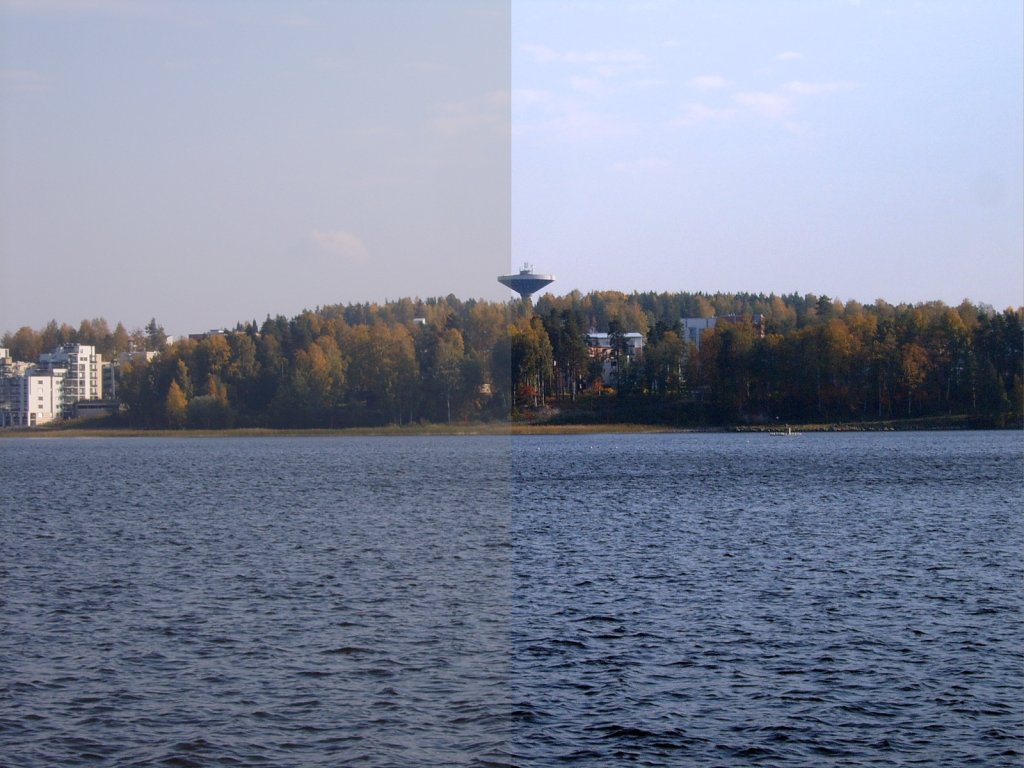
The contrast in the left half of the image is lower than that in the right half.

The high-frequency cut-off represents the optical limitations of the visual system's ability to resolve detail and is typically about 60 cpd. The high-frequency cut-off is also related to the packing density of the retinal photoreceptor cells: a finer matrix can resolve finer gratings.

The low frequency drop-off is due to lateral inhibition within the retinal ganglion cells. A typical retinal ganglion cell's receptive field comprises a central region in which light either excites or inhibits the cell, and a surround region in which light has the opposite effects.

One experimental phenomenon is the inhibition of blue in the periphery if blue light is displayed against a white background, leading to a yellow surrounding. The yellow is derived from the inhibition of blue on the surroundings by the center. Since white minus blue is red and green, this mixes to become yellow.

For example, in the case of graphical computer displays, contrast depends on the properties of the picture source or file and the properties of the computer display, including its variable settings. For some screens the angle between the screen surface and the observer's line of sight is also important.

== Quantifications ==
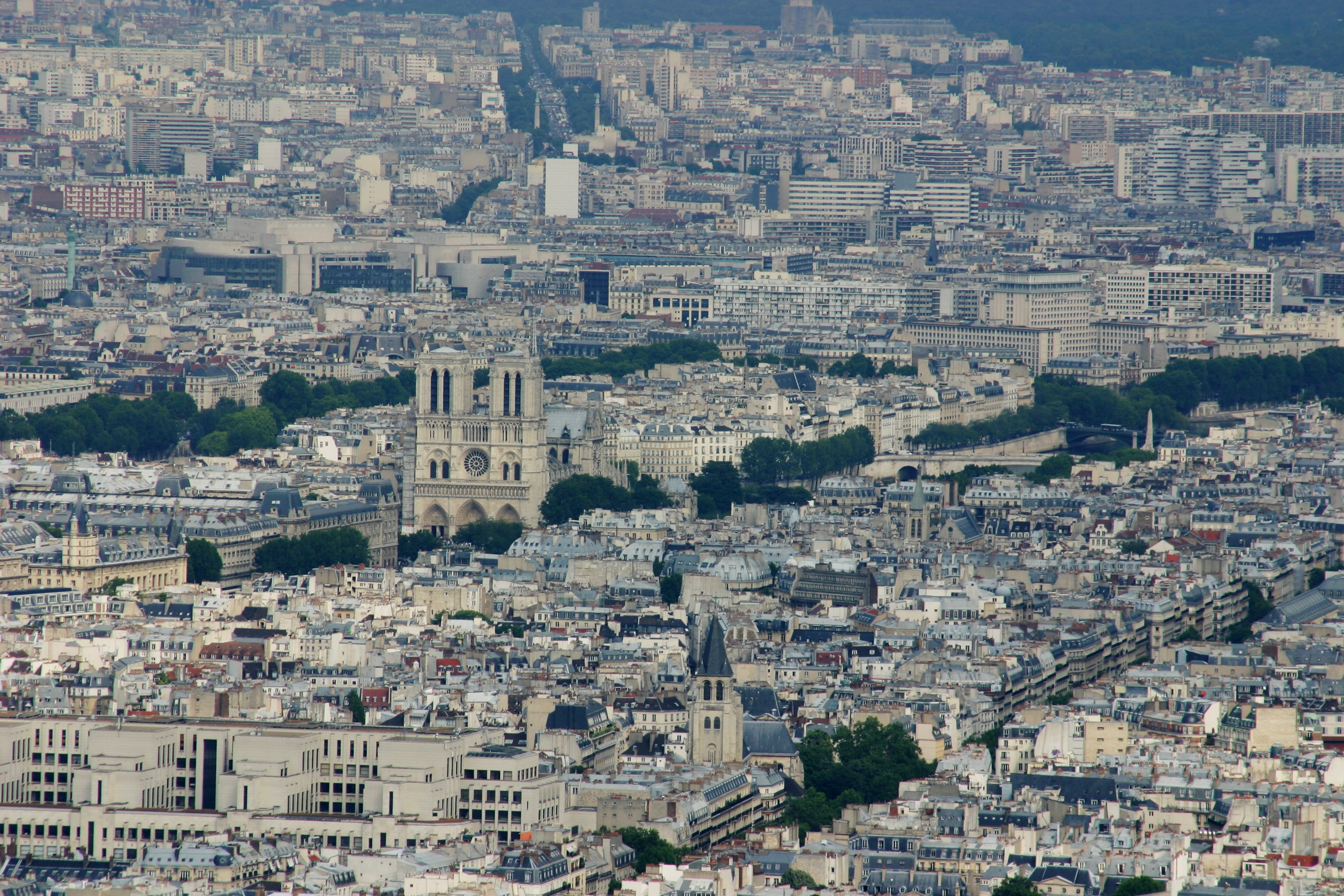
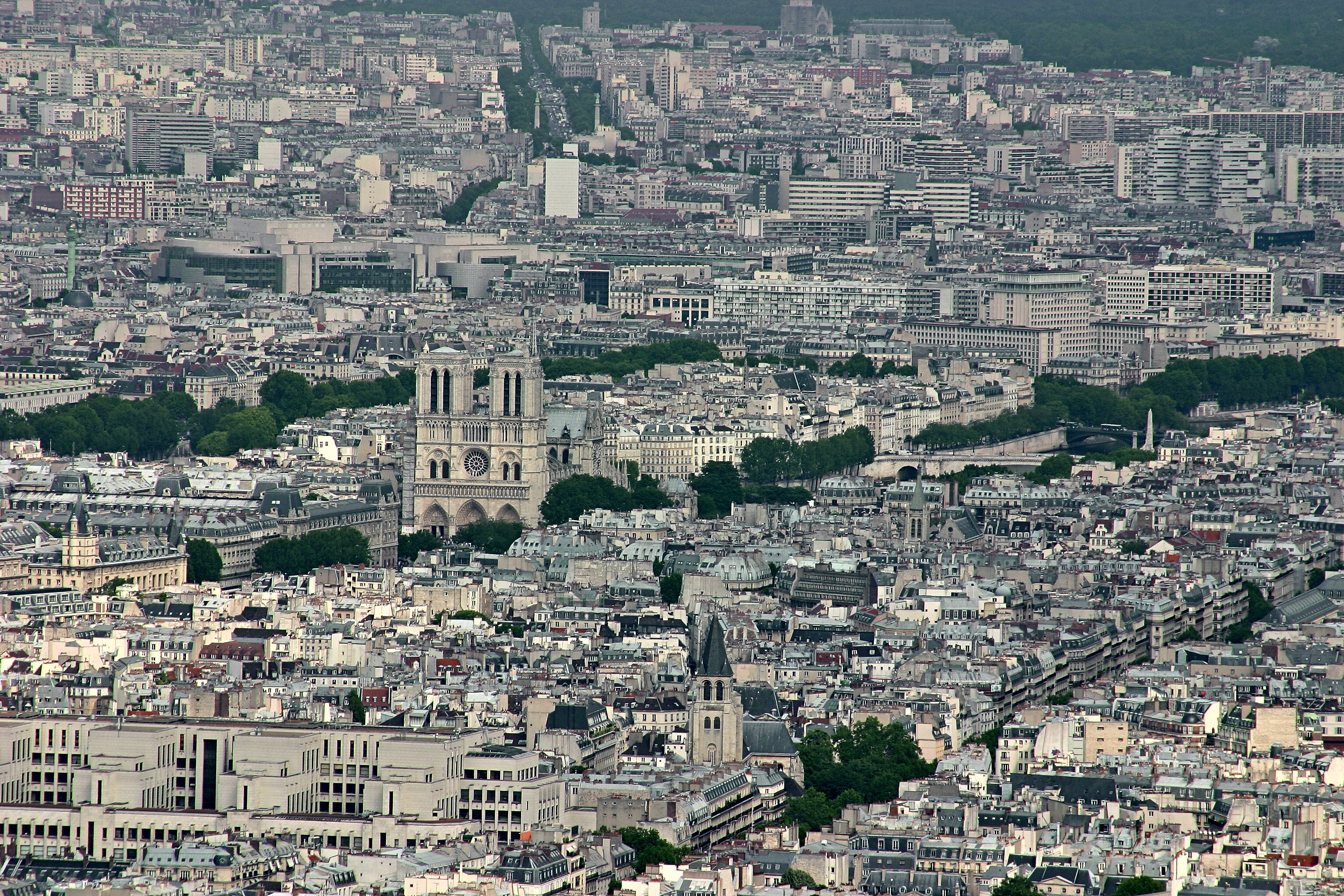
Original (top) and contrast-enhanced (bottom).

There are many possible definitions of contrast. Some include color; others do not. Russian scientist N. P. Travnikova laments, "Such a multiplicity of notions of contrast is extremely inconvenient. It complicates the solution of many applied problems and makes it difficult to compare the results published by different authors."

Various definitions of contrast are used in different situations. Here, luminance contrast is used as an example, but the formulas can also be applied to other physical quantities. In many cases, the definitions of contrast represent a ratio of the type

$$\frac{\mbox{Luminance difference}}{\mbox{Average luminance}}.$$

The rationale behind this is that a small difference is negligible if the average luminance is high, while the same small difference matters if the average luminance is low (see Weber–Fechner law). Below, some common definitions are given.

=== Weber contrast ===
Weber contrast is defined as

$$\frac{I-I_\mathrm{b}}{I_\mathrm{b}},$$

with $I$ and $I_\mathrm{b}$ representing the luminance of the features and the background, respectively. The measure is also referred to as Weber fraction, since it is the term that is constant in Weber's Law. Weber contrast is commonly used in cases where small features are present on a large uniform background, i.e., where the average luminance is approximately equal to the background luminance.

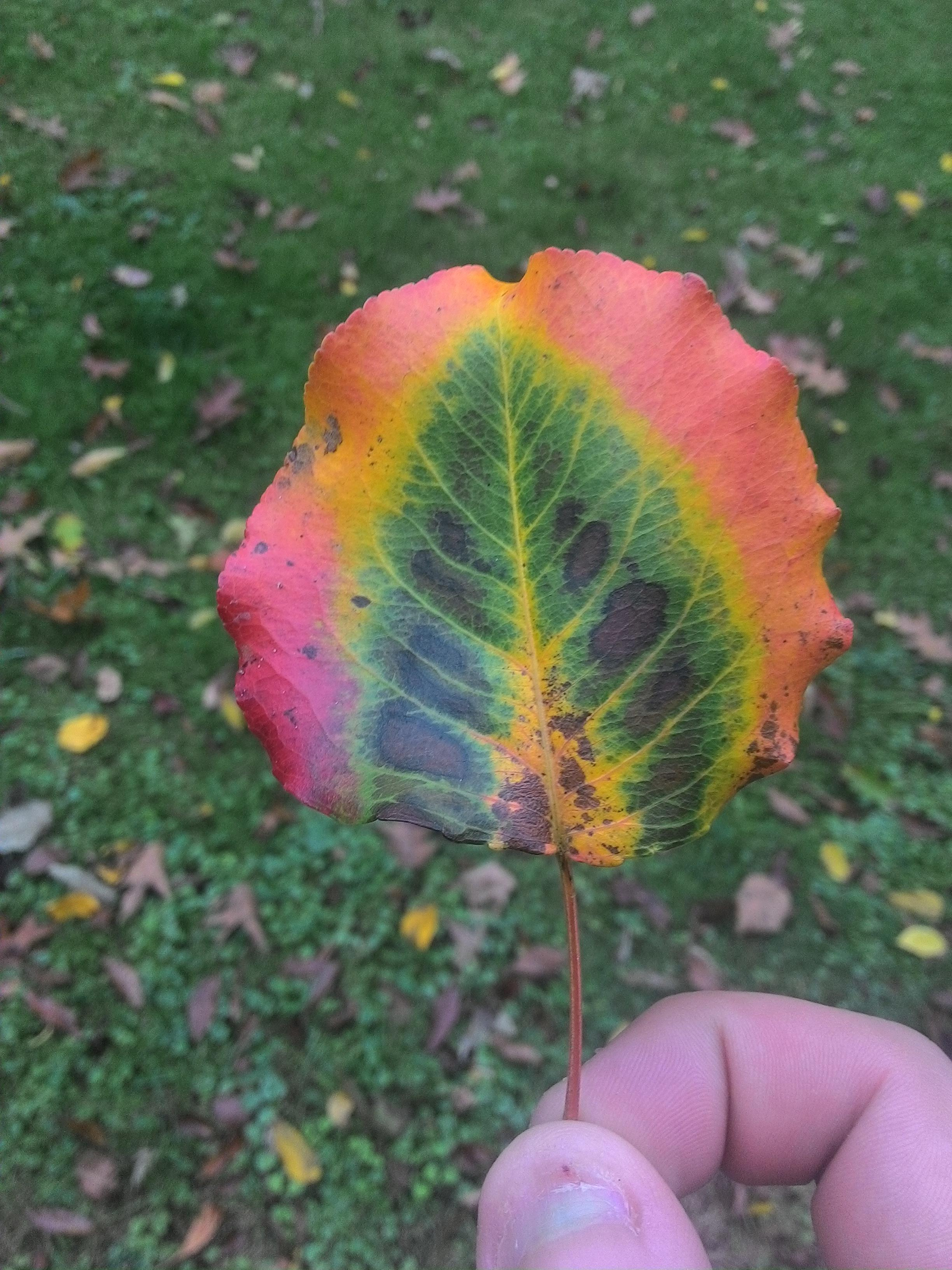

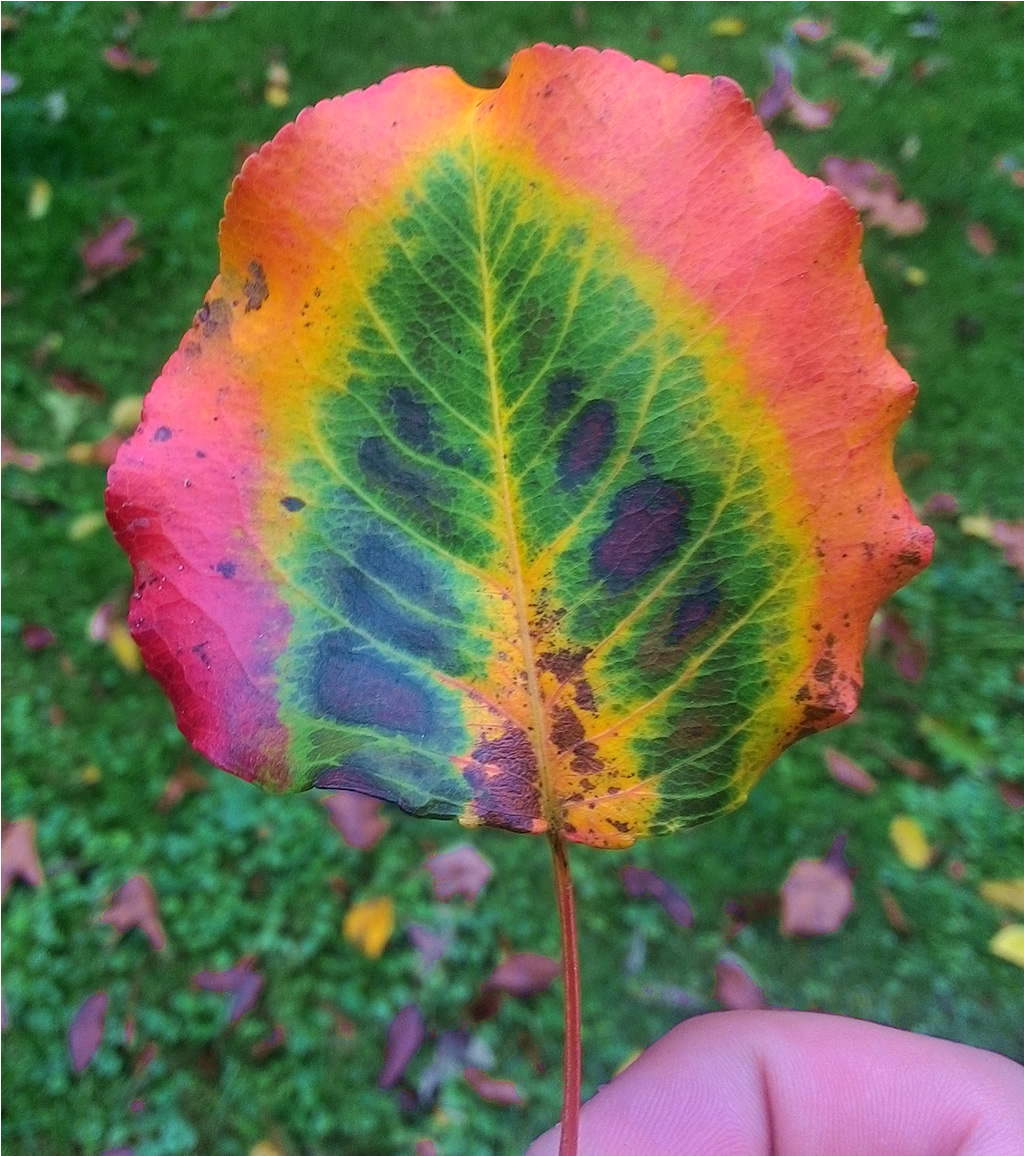
A photograph of a leaf with several colors—the bottom image has an 11% saturation boost and around 10% increase in contrast.

=== Michelson contrast ===
Michelson contrast (also known as visibility) is commonly used for patterns where both bright and dark features are equivalent and take up similar fractions of the area (e.g. sine-wave gratings). The Michelson contrast is defined as

$$\frac{I_\mathrm{max} - I_\mathrm{min}}{I_\mathrm{max} + I_\mathrm{min}},$$

with $I_\mathrm{max}$ and $I_\mathrm{min}$ representing the highest and lowest luminance. The denominator represents twice the average of the maximum and minimum luminances.

This form of contrast is an effective way to quantify contrast for periodic functions $f(x)$ and is also known as the modulation $m_{f}$ of a periodic signal $f$. Modulation quantifies the relative amount by which the amplitude (or difference) $(f_{\text{max}}-f_\text{min})/2$ of $f$ stands out from the average value (or background) $(f_{\text{max}}+f_\text{min})/2$.

In general, $m_{f}$ refers to the contrast of the periodic signal $f$ relative to its average value. If $m_{f}=0$, then $f$ has no contrast. If two periodic functions $f$ and $g$ have the same average value, then $f$ has more contrast than $g$ if $m_{f}>m_{g}$.

=== RMS contrast ===
Root-mean-square (RMS) contrast does not depend on the spatial frequency content or the spatial distribution of contrast in the image. RMS contrast is defined as the standard deviation of the pixel intensities:

$$\sqrt{\frac{1}{M N}\sum_{i=0}^{N-1}\sum_{j=0}^{M - 1}\left(I_{ij} - \bar{I}\right)^2}$$

where intensities $I_{ij}$ are the $i$-th $j$-th element of the two-dimensional image of size $M$ by $N$. $\bar{I}$ is the average intensity of all pixel values in the image. The image $I$ is assumed to have its pixel intensities normalized in the range $[0,1]$. This is equivalent to dividing the standard deviation of pixel intensities by the mean (with or without normalizing).

=== Haziness contrast ===
Alternative contrast measurement metrics, such as the haziness metric, have been developed to quantify contrast (or lack of contrast) with more intuitive notions of contrast: ability to differentiate different regions of the image.

== Contrast sensitivity ==
Contrast sensitivity is a measure of the ability to discern different luminances in a static image. It varies with age, increasing to a maximum around 20 years at spatial frequencies of about 2–5 cpd; aging then progressively attenuates contrast sensitivity beyond this peak. Factors such as cataracts and diabetic retinopathy also reduce contrast sensitivity. In the sweep grating figure below, at an ordinary viewing distance, the bars in the middle appear to be the longest due to their optimal spatial frequency. However, at a far viewing distance, the longest visible bars shift to what were originally the wide bars, now matching the spatial frequency of the middle bars at reading distance.

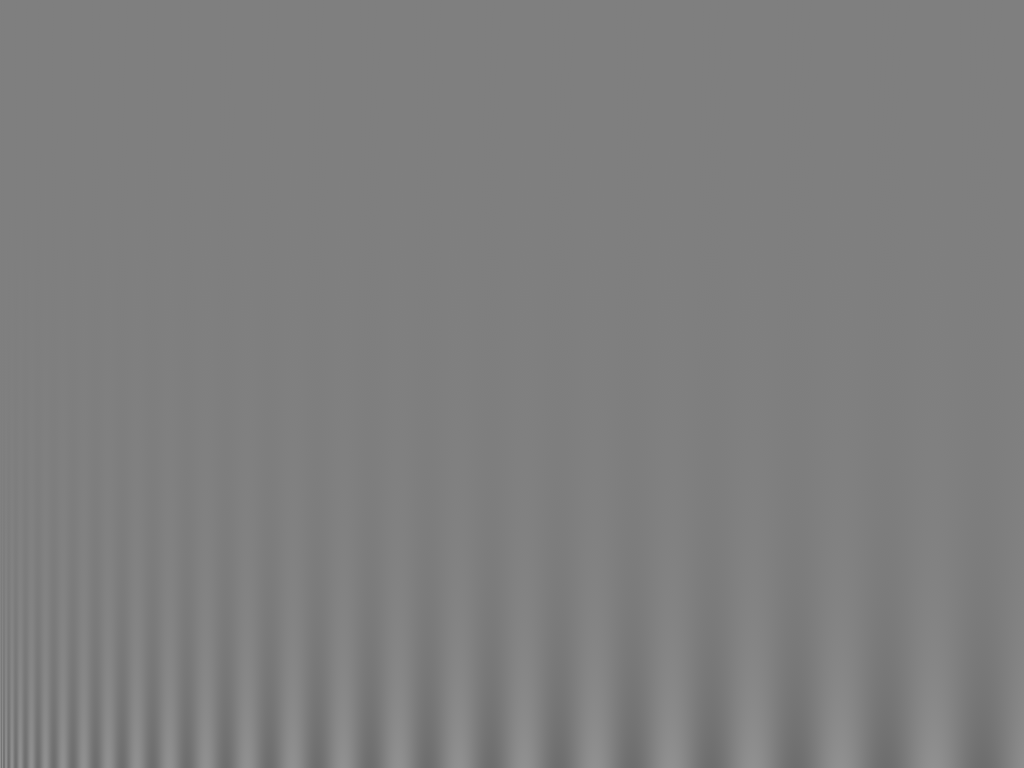
In this image of a "sweep grating", the contrast amplitude depends only on the vertical coordinate, and the spatial frequency depends only on the horizontal coordinate. For medium frequency, less contrast is needed than for high or low frequency to detect the bars.

=== Contrast sensitivity and visual acuity ===
Visual acuity is a parameter that is frequently used to assess overall vision. However, diminished contrast sensitivity may cause decreased visual function in spite of normal visual acuity. For example, some individuals with glaucoma may achieve 20/20 vision on acuity exams, yet struggle with activities of daily living, such as driving at night.

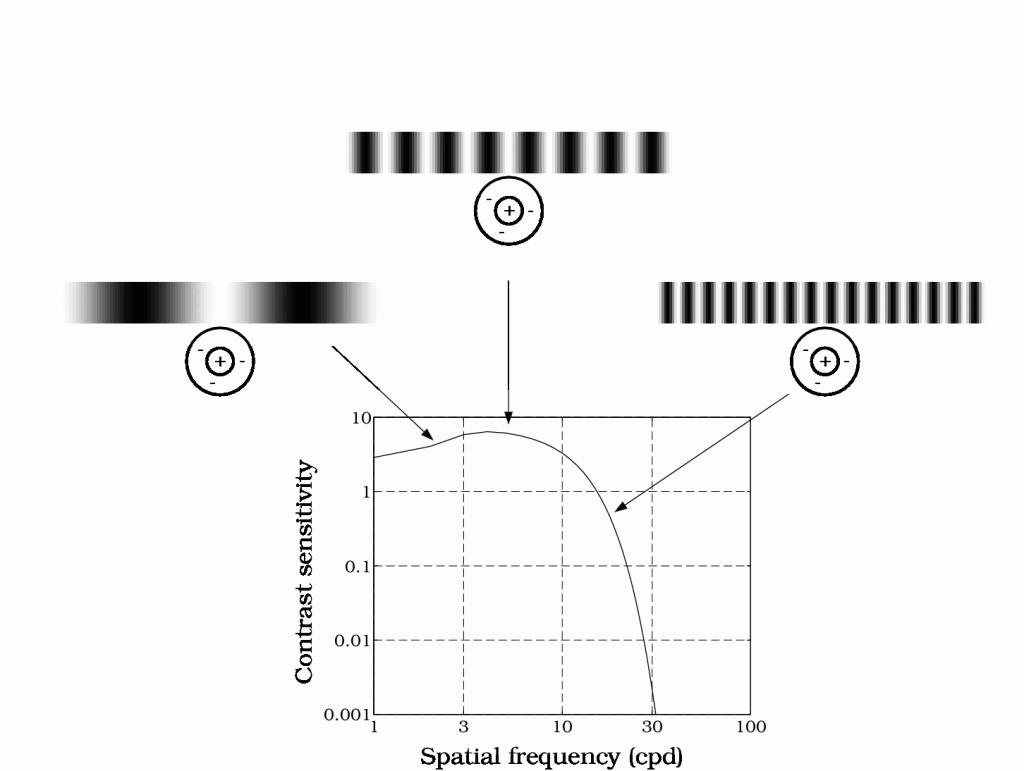
The graph demonstrates the relationship between contrast sensitivity and spatial frequency. The target-like images are representative of center-surround organization of neurons, with peripheral inhibition at low, intermediate and high spatial frequencies. Used with permission from Brian Wandell, PhD.

As mentioned above, contrast sensitivity describes the ability of the visual system to distinguish bright and dim components of a static image. Visual acuity can be defined as the angle with which one can resolve two points as being separate since the image is shown with 100% contrast and is projected onto the fovea of the retina. Thus, when an optometrist or ophthalmologist assesses a patient's visual acuity using a Snellen chart or some other acuity chart, the target image is displayed at high contrast, e.g., black letters of decreasing size on a white background. A subsequent contrast sensitivity exam may demonstrate difficulty with decreased contrast (using, e.g., the Pelli–Robson chart, which consists of uniform-sized but increasingly pale grey letters on a white background).

To assess a patient's contrast sensitivity, one of several diagnostic exams may be used. Most charts in an ophthalmologist's or optometrist's office will show images of varying contrast and spatial frequency. Parallel bars of varying width and contrast, known as sine-wave gratings, are sequentially viewed by the patient. The width of the bars and their distance apart represent spatial frequency, measured in cycles per degree.

Studies have demonstrated that contrast sensitivity is maximum for spatial frequencies of 2-5 cpd, falling off for lower spatial frequencies and rapidly falling off for higher spatial frequencies. The upper limit for the human vision system is about 60 cpd. The correct identification of small letters requires the letter size be about 18-30 cpd. Contrast threshold can be defined as the minimum contrast that can be resolved by the patient. Contrast sensitivity is typically expressed as the reciprocal of the threshold contrast for detection of a given pattern (i.e., 1 ÷ contrast threshold).

Using the results of a contrast sensitivity exam, a contrast sensitivity curve can be plotted, with spatial frequency on the horizontal, and contrast threshold on the vertical axis. Also known as contrast sensitivity function (CSF), the plot demonstrates the normal range of contrast sensitivity, and will indicate diminished contrast sensitivity in patients who fall below the normal curve. Some graphs contain "contrast sensitivity acuity equivalents", with lower acuity values falling in the area under the curve. In patients with normal visual acuity and concomitant reduced contrast sensitivity, the area under the curve serves as a graphical representation of the visual deficit. It can be because of this impairment in contrast sensitivity that patients have difficulty driving at night, climbing stairs and other activities of daily living in which contrast is reduced.

Log–log plot of spatial contrast sensitivity functions for luminance and chromatic contrast

Recent studies have demonstrated that intermediate-frequency sinusoidal patterns are optimally-detected by the retina due to the center-surround arrangement of neuronal receptive fields. In an intermediate spatial frequency, the peak (brighter bars) of the pattern is detected by the center of the receptive field, while the troughs (darker bars) are detected by the inhibitory periphery of the receptive field. For this reason, low- and high-spatial frequencies elicit excitatory and inhibitory impulses by overlapping frequency peaks and troughs in the center and periphery of the neuronal receptive field. Other environmental, physiological, and anatomical factors influence the neuronal transmission of sinusoidal patterns, including adaptation.

Decreased contrast sensitivity arises from multiple etiologies, including retinal disorders such as age-related macular degeneration (ARMD), amblyopia, lens abnormalities, such as cataract, and by higher-order neural dysfunction, including stroke and Alzheimer's disease. In light of the multitude of etiologies leading to decreased contrast sensitivity, contrast sensitivity tests are useful in the characterization and monitoring of dysfunction, and less helpful in detection of disease.

== Contrast threshold ==
Threshold data from Table 8 of Blackwell (1946) plotted as Figure 4 of Crumey (2014). Curves are for background luminances ranging from 3.426 × 10^{−5} cd m^{−2} (top) to 3.426 × 10^{3} cd m^{−2} (bottom) at intervals of one log unit.

A large-scale study of luminance contrast thresholds was done in the 1940s by Blackwell, using a forced-choice procedure. Discs of various sizes and luminances were presented in different positions against backgrounds at a wide range of adaptation luminances, and subjects had to indicate where they thought the disc was being shown. After statistical pooling of results (90,000 observations by seven observers), the threshold for a given target size and luminance was defined as the Weber contrast level at which there was a 50% detection level. The experiment employed a discrete set of contrast levels, resulting in discrete values of threshold contrast. Smooth curves were drawn through these, and values tabulated. The resulting data have been used extensively in areas such as lighting engineering and road safety.

A separate study by Knoll et al investigated thresholds for point sources by requiring subjects to vary the brightness of the source to find the level at which it was just visible. A mathematical formula for the resulting threshold curve was proposed by Hecht, with separate branches for scotopic and photopic vision. Hecht's formula was used by Weaver to model the naked-eye visibility of stars. The same formula was used later by Schaefer to model stellar visibility through a telescope.

Crumey showed that Hecht's formula fitted the data very poorly at low light levels, so was not really suitable for modelling stellar visibility. Crumey instead constructed a more accurate and general model applicable to both the Blackwell and Knoll et al data. Crumey's model covers all light levels, from zero background luminance to daylight levels, and instead of parameter-tuning is based on an underlying linearity related to Ricco's law. Crumey used it to model astronomical visibility for targets of arbitrary size, and to study the effects of light pollution.

== Test images ==
Test images types

- Pelli-Robson Contrast Sensitivity Chart
- Regan chart
- Arden grating chart
- Campbell-Robson Contrast Sensitivity Chart

== See also ==
- Acutance – Perception of image sharpness that is unrelated to actual resolution
- Color blindness – Decreased ability to see color or color differences
- Contrast ratio – Property of a display system
- Display contrast – Range of brightness of a display
- Eye examination – Series of tests assessing vision and pertaining to the eyes
- Optical resolution – Ability of an imaging system to resolve detail
- Psychophysics – Branch of knowledge relating physical stimuli and psychological perception
- Radiocontrast – Substance which enhances visibility in X-ray-based imaging
- Spatial frequency – Characteristic of any structure that is periodic across a position in space
- Visual acuity – Clarity of vision
