= Just-noticeable difference =

Amount a stimulus must be changed to be detected

An illustration of the Weber–Fechner law: 1. Circles in the upper row grow in arithmetic progression: each one is larger by 10 units than previous one. They make an impression of growing initially fast and then slower and slower (the difference between 10 and 20 seems larger than between 60 and 70).; 2. Circles in the lower row grow in geometric progression: each one is larger by 40% than previous one. They make an impression of growing by the same amount at each step.

In psychophysics, a just-noticeable difference (JND) is the amount something must be changed in order for a difference to be noticeable, detectable at least half the time. This limen is also known as the difference limen, difference threshold, or least perceptible difference.

== Quantification ==
For many sensory modalities, over a wide range of stimulus magnitudes sufficiently far from the upper and lower limits of perception, the 'JND' is a fixed proportion of the reference sensory level, and so the ratio of the JND/reference is roughly constant (that is the JND is a constant proportion/percentage of the reference level). Measured in physical units, we have:

$$\frac {\Delta I} {I} = k,$$

where $I\!$ is the original intensity of the particular stimulation, $\Delta I\!$ is the addition to it required for the change to be perceived (the JND), and k is a constant. This rule was first discovered by Ernst Heinrich Weber (1795–1878), an anatomist and physiologist, in experiments on the thresholds of perception of lifted weights. A theoretical rationale (not universally accepted) was subsequently provided by Gustav Fechner, so the rule is therefore known either as the Weber Law or as the Weber–Fechner law; the constant k is called the Weber constant. It is true, at least to a good approximation, of many but not all sensory dimensions, for example the brightness of lights, and the intensity and the pitch of sounds. It is not true, however, for the wavelength of light. Stanley Smith Stevens argued that it would hold only for what he called prothetic sensory continua, where change of input takes the form of increase in intensity or something obviously analogous; it would not hold for metathetic continua, where change of input produces a qualitative rather than a quantitative change of the percept. Stevens developed his own law, called Stevens' Power Law, that raises the stimulus to a constant power while, like Weber, also multiplying it by a constant factor in order to achieve the perceived stimulus.

The JND is a statistical, rather than an exact quantity: from trial to trial, the difference that a given person notices will vary somewhat, and it is therefore necessary to conduct many trials in order to determine the threshold. The JND usually reported is the difference that a person notices on 50% of trials. If a different proportion is used, this should be included in the description—for example one might report the value of the "75% JND".

Modern approaches to psychophysics, for example signal detection theory, imply that the observed JND, even in this statistical sense, is not an absolute quantity, but will depend on situational and motivational as well as perceptual factors. For example, when a researcher flashes a very dim light, a participant may report seeing it on some trials but not on others.

The JND formula has an objective interpretation (implied at the start of this entry) as the disparity between levels of the presented stimulus that is detected on 50% of occasions by a particular observed response, rather than what is subjectively "noticed" or as a difference in magnitudes of consciously experienced 'sensations'. This 50%-discriminated disparity can be used as a universal unit of measurement of the psychological distance of the level of a feature in an object or situation and an internal standard of comparison in memory, such as the 'template' for a category or the 'norm' of recognition. The JND-scaled distances from norm can be combined among observed and inferred psychophysical functions to generate diagnostics among hypothesised information-transforming (mental) processes mediating observed quantitative judgments.

== Music production applications ==
In music production, a single change in a property of sound which is below the JND does not affect perception of the sound. For amplitude, the JND for humans is around 1 dB.

The JND for tone is dependent on the tone's frequency content. Below 500 Hz, the JND is about 3 Hz for sine waves; above 1000 Hz, the JND for sine waves is about 0.6% (about 10 cents).

The JND is typically tested by playing two tones in quick succession with the listener asked if there was a difference in their pitches. The JND becomes smaller if the two tones are played simultaneously as the listener is then able to discern beat frequencies. The total number of perceptible pitch steps in the range of human hearing is about 1,400; the total number of notes in the equal-tempered scale, from 16 to 16,000 Hz, is 120.

== In speech perception ==
JND analysis is frequently occurring in both music and speech, the two being related and overlapping in the analysis of speech prosody (i.e. speech melody). Although JND varies as a function of the frequency band being tested, it has been shown that JND for the best performers at around 1 kHz is well below 1 Hz, (i.e. less than a tenth of a percent). It is, however, important to be aware of the role played by critical bandwidth when performing this kind of analysis.

When analysing speech melody, rather than musical tones, accuracy decreases. This is not surprising given that speech does not stay at fixed intervals in the way that tones in music do. Johan 't Hart (1981) found that JND for speech averaged between 1 and 2 STs but concluded that "only differences of more than 3 semitones play a part in communicative situations".

Note that, given the logarithmic characteristics of Hz, for both music and speech perception results should not be reported in Hz but either as percentages or in STs (5 Hz between 20 and 25 Hz is very different from 5 Hz between 2000 and 2005 Hz, but an ~18.9% or 3 semitone increase is perceptually the same size difference, regardless of whether one starts at 20Hz or at 2000Hz).

== Marketing applications ==
Weber's law has important applications in marketing. Manufacturers and marketers endeavor to determine the relevant JND for their products for two very different reasons:

1. so that negative changes (e.g. reductions in product size or quality, or increase in product price) are not discernible to the public (i.e. remain below JND) and
2. so that product improvements (e.g. improved or updated packaging, larger size or lower price) are very apparent to consumers without being wastefully extravagant (i.e. they are at or just above the JND).

When it comes to product improvements, marketers very much want to meet or exceed the consumer's differential threshold; that is, they want consumers to readily perceive any improvements made in the original products. Marketers use the JND to determine the amount of improvement they should make in their products. Less than the JND is wasted effort because the improvement will not be perceived; more than the JND is again wasteful because it reduces the level of repeat sales. On the other hand, when it comes to price increases, less than the JND is desirable because consumers are unlikely to notice it.

== Haptics applications ==
Weber's law is used in haptic devices and robotic applications. Exerting the proper amount of force to human operator is a critical aspects in human robot interactions and tele operation scenarios. It can highly improve the performance of the user in accomplishing a task.

== See also ==
- Absolute threshold
- ABX test
- Color difference
- Limen
- Minimal clinically important difference
- Mutatis mutandis
- Psychometric function
- Sensor resolution
- Visual perception
- Weber–Fechner law
