= Limen (disambiguation) =

Limen is a word of equivocal semantics written in the Latin alphabet, and used in many different modern languages, including English. It generally, but not necessarily, represents the Latin word limen, plural limina, “threshold,” or is a transliteration into the Latin alphabet of the ancient Greek word, λιμήν, “harbor, refuge, creek.” Some specific uses are:

== Anthropology ==
- Limen, a Chinese word for “gateway of the principle” used in Zailiism

== Science ==
- Limen, a threshold of a physiological or psychological response
- Limen insulae, the junction point between anterior and posterior stem of the sylvian fissure in the brain
- Limen nasi, a mucous ridge between the nasal vestibule and the rest of nasal cavity
- Difference limen, a Just-noticeable difference in experimental psychology
- Limenavis, “threshold bird” a fossil bird genus

== Geography ==
- Borboros Limen, ancient name of Giannitsa, Greece
- Dioecesis Iuen-limensis, the Roman Catholic Diocese of Yuanling
- Elaias Limen, an ancient harbor town at the mouth of the Acheron river of Epirus
- Karon Limen, ancient name for Shabla, a city on the Black Sea
- Leucus Limen, ancient name for Al-Qusayr, Egypt
- limen Trichonis, ancient name for Lake Trichonida, the largest natural lake in Greece
- Limenwara, early administrative subdivision of the Kingdom of Kent
- Pelodes Limen, unknown harbor of an unknown stream, Pelodes, mentioned by Strabo
- Symbolon Limen, ancient name for Dolichenus in Roman Crimea

== Other ==
- limen sali, an unknown phrase in the ancient Carmen Arvale
- Limen (ballet), a work of Wayne McGregor
- limen, theoretical chimera of a lime and a lemon

== See also ==
- Liminal (disambiguation)
