= Liminal =

Liminal or Liminality may refer to:

== Anthropology and religion ==
- Liminality, the quality of ambiguity or disorientation that occurs in the middle stage of a rite of passage
- Liminal deity, a god or goddess in mythology who presides over thresholds, gates, or doorways
- Liminal being, mythical being of ambiguous existence
- Liminal state, English translation of bardo in Tibetan Buddhism

== Arts and media ==
- Liminal (Beatie Wolfe and Brian Eno album), 2025
- Liminal (Avralize album), 2025
- .hack//Liminality, an animated series related to the .hack video game series
- Liminal, a student literary journal at University of Minnesota, United States
- Liminal, a 2017 remix album by Sigur Rós
- Liminal, a 2022 album by Petbrick, see Igor Cavalera
- Liminal space (aesthetic), empty places that appear eerie
- Liminal (film), an upcoming American science fiction action thriller film

== Psychology ==
- Limen, a threshold of a physiological or psychological response
- Liminal experiences, feelings of abandonment (existentialism) associated with death, illness, disaster, etc.

== See also ==
- Limen (disambiguation)
- Limerence, a stage or state of mind in a relationship
- Limina, a comune in the Messina, Sicily, Italy
