= Absolute threshold =

Neuroscience principle

In neuroscience and psychophysics, an absolute threshold was originally defined as the lowest level of a stimulus – light, sound, touch, etc. – that an organism could detect. Under the influence of signal detection theory, absolute threshold has been redefined as the level at which a stimulus will be detected a specified percentage (often 50%) of the time. The absolute threshold can be influenced by several different factors, such as the subject's motivations and expectations, cognitive processes, and whether the subject is adapted to the stimulus.

The absolute threshold can be compared to the difference threshold, which is the measure of how different two stimuli must be for the subject to notice that they are not the same.

== Vision ==
A landmark 1942 experiment by Hecht, Shlaer, and Pirenne assessed the absolute threshold for vision. They tried to measure the minimum number of photons the human eye can detect 60% of the time, using the following controls:

1. Dark adaptation – the participants were completely dark adapted (a process lasting forty minutes) to optimise their visual sensitivity.
2. Location – the stimulus was presented to an area of the right eye where there is a high density of rod cells, 20 degrees to the left of the point of focus (i.e. 20 degrees to the right of the fovea). Roughly this degree of eccentricity (about 20 degrees) has the highest rod density across the whole retina. However, the corresponding location on the right retina, 20 degrees to the left, is very near the blind spot.
3. Stimulus size – the stimulus had a diameter of 10 minutes of arc (1 minute = 1/60th of a degree). Although not explicitly mentioned in the original research paper, this ensured that the light stimulus fell only on rod cells connected to the same nerve fibre (this is called the area of spatial summation).
4. Wavelength – the stimulus wavelength matched the maximum sensitivity of rod cells (510 nm).
5. Stimulus duration – 0.001 second (1 ms).

The researchers found that the emission of only 5–14 photons could elicit visual experience. However, only about half of these entered the retina, due to reflection (from the cornea), absorption, and other factors relating to transmittance of the ocular media. The researchers estimated that 5 to 14 of the estimated 500 rods in the test area would each absorb one photon, with a 4% chance that one rod would absorb two photons.

A second absolute threshold for vision involves the minimum photon flux (photons per second per unit area). In this case the light covers a wide field over an extended period of time instead of being concentrated on one spot on the retina in a short burst. Knowing the pupil diameter and the wavelength of the light, the result can be described in terms of luminance (~0.000001 candela per square meter or 10^{−6} cd/m^{2}) or retinal illuminance (~0.00002 Trolands). By including estimates for the probability of an average photon being absorbed by an average rod cell, the threshold stimulation for the rods is approximately one photon absorption per second per 5000 rods.

In terms of total absolute power sensitivity, Denton and Pirenne in The Journal of Physiology in 1954 found that for diffuse, extended sources i.e. a relatively large (~ 45-degree wide source, as viewed by the subject) frosted glass aperture, and a long (5 second) observation and decision time, the human eye could begin to reliably distinguish the lit from unlit glass at a power level of approximately 7.6 × 10^{−14} watts / steradian-cm^{2} at the eye for green (510 nm) light. This power level was dependent on the wavelength of the light used according to the usual luminosity curve. For white light, the absolute sensitivity found was 5.9 × 10^{−14} watts / steradian-cm^{2}. This base sensitivity varied only about 0.03 log steps between monocular (one-eyed) or binocular (two-eyed) vision.

In 1972 Sakitt conducted an experiment that combined elements of signal detection and threshold theory. Two key elements of the study were a high tolerance for false positives and a multiple-choice option on deciding whether or not a light was seen. In the classic studies described above, the tolerance for false positives was so low that threshold was biased upward. Based on statistical analysis of a large number of trials, 6 photons each absorbed by one rod near-simultaneously looked "very bright", 5 photons looked "bright", 4 photons "a moderate light", 3 photons "a dim light". Two observers were able to see 2 photons as "slightly doubtful if a light was seen." One observer saw a single photon as "very doubtful if a light was seen." Zero photons were seen as "did not see anything".

== Hearing ==
The absolute threshold of hearing is the minimum sound level of a pure tone that an average ear with normal hearing can hear with no other sound present. The absolute threshold relates to the sound that can just be heard by the organism. The threshold of hearing is generally reported as the RMS sound pressure of 20 μPa (micropascals) = 2×10^{−5} pascal (Pa). It is approximately the quietest sound a young human with undamaged hearing can detect at 1,000 Hz. The threshold of hearing is frequency dependent and it has been shown that the ear's sensitivity is best at frequencies between 1 kHz and 5 kHz. Humans typically have a lower hearing threshold for their own names. Dennis P. Carmody and Michael Lewis studied this phenomenon in 2006 and found that brain regions respond to the person's name differently than they do to a random name.

== Odor ==
The odor detection threshold is the lowest concentration of a certain odor compound that is perceivable by the human sense of smell. The threshold of a chemical compound is determined in part by its shape, polarity, partial charges and molecular mass. The olfactory mechanisms responsible for each compound's detection threshold is not well understood; thus these thresholds cannot yet be accurately predicted. Rather, they must be measured through extensive tests using human subjects in laboratory settings.

== Touch ==
According to a 1962 study done by Galanter, the absolute threshold for touch is described as a bee's wing dropped onto a person's cheek from one centimeter (0.4 inches) away. Different parts of the body are more sensitive to touch, so this varies from one body part to the next (20). In 1974, Ulf Lindblom studied how the speed of a stimulus affects absolute threshold. A WaveTek stimulator was used to measure absolute threshold of touch by "tapping" a participant's finger pad with a 2 mm diameter probe. Lindblom found that on average, there was a 27% difference in threshold level between slow and fast mechanical pulses on a participant's finger pad. The threshold for rapid pulses was 5 μm, and 80 μm for slow pulses. Lindblom's study shows that humans are more sensitive to fast stimulation than slow stimulation, at least for touch.

As people age, the absolute threshold for touch becomes larger, especially after age 65. In general, women have a lower absolute threshold and are more sensitive to touch than men. However, it also seems to vary from person to person. Even individuals experience long-term variation within their own absolute threshold for touch. This could potentially affect how sensory disorders are evaluated by medical professionals.

== Taste ==
In 1999, J. A. Stillman, R. P. Morton, and D. Goldsmith performed a study testing absolute threshold of taste and found that automated testing of taste was just as reliable as traditional testing. Additionally, they found statistical significance of the right side of the tongue having a lower absolute threshold than the left side. This finding leads to the possibility that the right hemisphere of the brain is better at processing gustatory stimuli than the left. Being deprived of calories for a short time increases sensitivity to and decreases absolute threshold for sweet and salty foods. Other factors such as pregnancy and smoking can influence taste sensitivity.

== Sensory processing disorder ==
Some people have an abnormally high or low absolute threshold for one or more senses that interferes with their quality of life. They tend to avoid stimulation, seek after it, or perhaps not notice it at all. This can be diagnosed as a sensory processing disorder, also known as sensory integration dysfunction, which is common in people with autism.

== See also ==
- Limen
- Psychometric function
- Sensory threshold
