= Gustav Fechner =

German experimental psychologist, physicist, and philosopher (1801–1887)

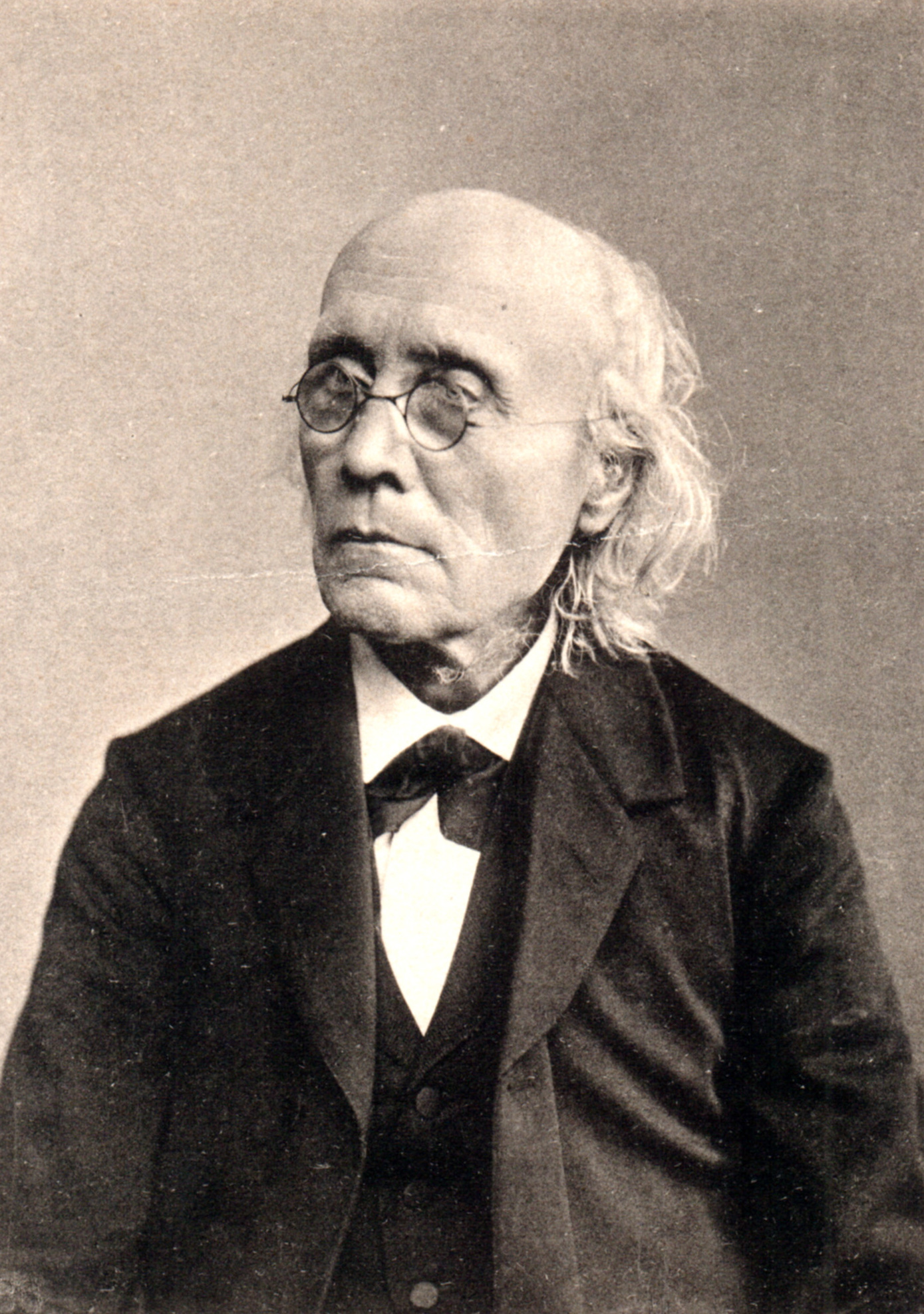
- Born: Gustav Theodor Fechner; 19 April 1801; Groß Särchen (near Muskau), Saxony, Holy Roman Empire
- Died: 18 November 1887 (aged 86); Leipzig, Saxony, German Empire
- Education: Medizinische Akademie Carl Gustav Carus; Leipzig University (PhD, 1835)
- Known for: Weber–Fechner law
- Scientific career
- Fields: Experimental psychology
- Workplaces: Leipzig University
- Thesis: De variis intensitatem vis Galvanicae metiendi methodis (Various methods of measuring Galvanic force intensity) (1835)
- Notable students: Hermann Lotze

Gustav Theodor Fechner (/ˈfɛxnər/; German: [ˈfɛçnɐ]; 19 April 1801 – 18 November 1887) was a German physicist, philosopher, and experimental psychologist. A pioneer in experimental psychology and founder of psychophysics (techniques for measuring the mind), he inspired many 20th-century scientists and philosophers. He is also credited with demonstrating the non-linear relationship between psychological sensation and the physical intensity of a stimulus via the formula: $S = K \ln I$, which became known as the Weber–Fechner law.

== Early life and scientific career ==
Fechner was born at Groß Särchen, near Muskau, in Lower Lusatia, where his father, a maternal uncle, and his paternal grandfather were pastors. His mother, Johanna Dorothea Fechner (b. 1774), née Fischer, also came from a religious family. Some biographers consider, that despite these religious influences, Fechner became an atheist in later life, while others say that Fechner had his own religious system of belief, a synthesis of Christianity and paganism.

Fechner's father, Samuel Traugott Fischer Fechner (1765-1806) was free-thinking in many ways, such as having his children vaccinated, teaching them Latin, and being a passionate grower of fruit. He died unexpectedly in 1806, leaving the family destitute. Fechner had an elder brother, Eduard Clemens Fechner (1799-1861) and three younger sisters: Emilie, Clementine, and Mathilde. Fechner and his brother were then raised for a few years by his maternal uncle, a pastor, before being reunited with his mother and sisters in Dresden.

Fechner was educated first at Sorau (now Żary in Western Poland).

In 1817 Fechner studied medicine for six months at the Medizinische Akademie Carl Gustav Carus in Dresden and from 1818 at the University of Leipzig, the city in which he spent the rest of his life. He earned his PhD from Leipzig in 1823.

In 1834, he was appointed professor of physics at Leipzig. In 1839, he injured his eyes in the research on afterimages by gazing at the Sun through colored glasses, while studying the phenomena of color and vision, and after much suffering, resigned from his position. Subsequently, whilst in recovery, he turned to the study of the mind and its relations with the body, giving public lectures on the subjects dealt with in his books. Whilst lying in bed, Fechner had an insight into the relationship between mental sensations and material sensations. This insight proved to be significant in the development of psychology, as there was now a quantitative relationship between the mental and physical worlds.

== Contributions ==
Fechner published chemical and physical papers, and translated chemical works by Jean-Baptiste Biot and Louis Jacques Thénard from French. He also wrote several poems and humorous pieces, such as the Vergleichende Anatomie der Engel (1825), written under the pseudonym of "Dr. Mises."

=== Elemente der Psychophysik ===
Fechner's epoch-making work was his Elemente der Psychophysik (1860). He started from the monistic thought that bodily facts and conscious facts, though not reducible one to the other, are different sides of one reality. His originality lies in trying to discover an exact mathematical relation between them. The most famous outcome of his inquiries is the law known as Fechner's law, which may be expressed as follows:

"In order that the intensity of a sensation may increase in arithmetical progression, the stimulus must increase in geometrical progression."

The law has been found to be immensely useful, but to fail for very faint and for very strong sensations. Within its useful range, Fechner's law is that sensation is a logarithmic function of physical intensity. S. S. Stevens pointed out that such a law does not account for the fact that perceived relationships among stimuli (e.g., papers coloured black, dark grey, grey, light grey, and white) are unchanged with changes in overall intensity (i.e., in the level of illumination of the papers). He proposed, in his famous 1961 paper entitled "To Honor Fechner and Repeal His Law", that intensity of stimulation is related to perception via a power-law.

Fechner's general formula for getting at the number of units in any sensation is S = c log R, where S stands for the sensation, R for the stimulus numerically estimated, and c for a constant that must be separately determined by experiment in each particular order of sensibility. Fechner's reasoning has been criticized on the grounds that although stimuli are composite, sensations are not. "Every sensation," says William James, "presents itself as an indivisible unit; and it is quite impossible to read any clear meaning into the notion that they are masses of units combined."

=== Fechner color effect ===
A sample of a Benham's disk

In 1838, he also studied the still-mysterious perceptual illusion of what is still called the Fechner color effect, whereby colors are seen in a moving pattern of black and white. The English journalist and amateur scientist Charles Benham, in 1894, enabled English-speakers to learn of the effect through the invention of the spinning top that bears his name, Benham's top. Whether Fechner and Benham ever actually met face to face is not known.

=== The median ===
In his Vorschule der Aesthetik (1876) he used the method of extreme ranks for subjective judgements. Two years later he published a paper which developed the notion of the median and is generally credited with introducing the median into the formal analysis of data. He later explored experimental aesthetics and attempted to determine the shapes and dimensions of aesthetically pleasing objects, using as a database the sizes of paintings.

=== Synesthesia ===
In 1871, Fechner reported the first empirical survey of coloured letter photisms among 73 synesthetes. His work was followed in the 1880s by that of Francis Galton.

=== Corpus callosum split ===
One of Fechner's speculations about consciousness dealt with brain. During his time, it was known that the brain is bilaterally symmetrical and that there is a deep division between the two halves that are linked by a connecting band of fibers called the corpus callosum. Fechner speculated that if the corpus callosum were split, two separate streams of consciousness would result - the mind would become two. While Fechner believed that his theory would never be tested, during the mid-twentieth century, Roger Sperry and Michael Gazzaniga worked on epileptic patients with sectioned corpus callosum and found evidence that Fechner's idea was correct.

=== Golden section hypothesis ===
Fechner constructed ten rectangles with different ratios of width to length and asked numerous observers to choose the "best" and "worst" rectangle shape. He was concerned with the visual appeal of rectangles with different proportions. Participants were explicitly instructed to disregard any associations that they have with the rectangles, e.g. with objects of similar ratios. The rectangles chosen as "best" by the largest number of participants and as "worst" by the fewest participants had a ratio of 0.62 (21:34). This ratio is known as the "golden section" (or golden ratio) and referred to the ratio of a rectangle's width to length that is most appealing to the eye. Carl Stumpf was a participant in this study.

However, there has been some ongoing dispute on the experiment itself, as the fact that Fechner deliberately discarded results of the study ill-fitting to his needs became known, with many mathematicians, including Mario Livio, refuting the result of the experiment.

=== Two-piece normal distribution ===
In his posthumously published Kollektivmasslehre (1897), Fechner introduced the Zweiseitige Gauss'sche Gesetz or two-piece normal distribution, to accommodate the asymmetries he had observed in empirical frequency distributions in many fields. The distribution has been independently rediscovered by several authors working in different fields.

=== Fechner's paradox ===
In 1861, Fechner reported that if he looked at a light with a darkened piece of glass over one eye then closed that eye, the light appeared to become brighter, even though less light was coming into his eyes. This phenomenon has come to be called Fechner's paradox. It has been the subject of numerous research papers, including in the 2000s. It occurs because the perceived brightness of the light with both eyes open is similar to the average brightness of each light viewed with one eye.

== Influence ==
Fechner, along with Wilhelm Wundt and Hermann von Helmholtz, is recognized as one of the founders of modern experimental psychology. His clearest contribution was the demonstration that because the mind was susceptible to measurement and mathematical treatment, psychology had the potential to become a quantified science. Theorists such as Immanuel Kant had long stated that this was impossible, and that therefore, a science of psychology was also impossible.

Though he had a vast influence on psychophysics, the actual disciples of his general philosophy were few. Ernst Mach was inspired by his work on psychophysics. William James also admired his work: in 1904, he wrote an admiring introduction to the English translation of Fechner's Büchlein vom Leben nach dem Tode (Little Book of Life After Death).

The composer Gustav Mahler read Fechner as a student, and he identified with Fechner when writing his Second Symphony, his Third, and Das Lied von der Erde.

Furthermore, he influenced Sigmund Freud, who refers to Fechner when introducing the concept of psychic locality in his The Interpretation of Dreams that he illustrates with the microscope-metaphor.

Fechner's world concept was highly animistic. He felt the thrill of life everywhere, in plants, earth, stars, the total universe. Fechner was a panpsychist; he viewed the entire universe as being inwardly alive and consciously animated, instead of being dead "stuff" as accepted by most of his contemporary colleagues, who had become devotees to what was becoming known as material science. Yet he based his panpsychism on a well thought out description of consciousness as waves. He believed that human beings stand midway between the souls of plants and the souls of stars, who are angels. God, the soul of the universe, must be conceived as having an existence analogous to human beings. Natural laws are just the modes of the unfolding of God's perfection. In his last work Fechner, aged but full of hope, contrasts this joyous "daylight view" of the world with the dead, dreary "night view" of materialism. Fechner's work in aesthetics is also important. He conducted experiments to show that certain abstract forms and proportions are naturally pleasing to our senses, and gave some new illustrations of the working of aesthetic association. Charles Hartshorne saw him as a predecessor on his and Alfred North Whitehead's philosophy and regretted that Fechner's philosophical work had been neglected for so long.

Fechner's position in reference to predecessors and contemporaries is not very sharply defined. He was remotely a disciple of Schelling, learned much from Baruch Spinoza, G. W. Leibniz, Johann Friedrich Herbart, Arthur Schopenhauer, and Christian Hermann Weisse, and decidedly rejected G. W. F. Hegel and the monadism of Rudolf Hermann Lotze.

Fechner's work continues to have an influence on modern science, inspiring continued exploration of human perceptual abilities by researchers such as Jan Koenderink, Farley Norman, David Heeger, and others.

== Honours ==
=== Fechner Crater ===
In 1970, the International Astronomical Union named the Fechner crater on the far side of the Moon after Fechner.

=== Fechner Day ===
In 1985 the International Society for Psychophysics called its annual conference Fechner Day. The conference is now scheduled to include 22 October to allow psychophysicists to celebrate the anniversary of Fechner's waking up on that day in 1850 with a new approach into how to study the mind. Fechner Day runs annually with the 2021 Fechner Day being the 37th. It is organized annually, by a different academic host each year. During the pandemic resulting from COVID-19, Fechner Day was held online in 2020 and 2021.

== Family and later life ==
Little is known of Fechner's later years, nor of the circumstances, cause, and manner of his death.

Fechner was the brother of painter Eduard Clemens Fechner and of Clementine Wieck Fechner, who was the stepmother of Clara Wieck when Clementine became her father Friedrich Wieck's second wife.

== Works ==
A variety of Fechner's shorter religious and philosophical writings in English translation is available in: Religion of a scientist; selections from Gustav Th. Fechner, edited & translated by Walter Lowrie. Pantheon Books, 1946. Internet Archive

- Praemissae ad theoriam organismi generalem ("Advances in the general theory of organisms") (1823).
- (Dr. Mises) Stapelia mixta (1824). Internet Archive (Harvard)
- Resultate der bis jetzt unternommenen Pflanzenanalysen ("Results of plant analyses undertaken to date") (1829). Internet Archive (Stanford)
- Maassbestimmungen über die galvanische Kette (1831).
- (Dr. Mises) Schutzmittel für die Cholera ("Protective equipment for cholera") (1832). Google (Harvard) — Google (UWisc)
- Repertorium der Experimentalphysik (1832). 3 volumes.
  - Volume 1. Internet Archive (NYPL) — Internet Archive (Oxford)
  - Volume 2. Internet Archive (NYPL) — Internet Archive (Oxford)
  - Volume 3. Internet Archive (NYPL) — Internet Archive (Oxford)
- (ed.) Das Hauslexicon. Vollständiges Handbuch praktischer Lebenskenntnisse für alle Stände (1834–38). 8 volumes.
- Das Büchlein vom Leben nach dem Tode (1836). 6th ed., 1906. Internet Archive (Harvard) — Internet Archive (NYPL)
  - First English translation, by Dr. Hugo Wernekke: On Life After Death (1882). Google (Oxford) — IA (UToronto) 2nd ed., 1906. Internet Archive (UMich) 3rd ed., 1914. IA (UIllinois)
  - Second English translation, by Mary C. Wadsworth, with an introduction by William James: The Little Book of Life After Death (1904). IA (UToronto) 1905, Internet Archive (UCal) — IA (Ucal) — IA (UToronto)
    - Reprinted in Life After Death, Pantheon Books, 1943, along with extracts from Fechner's Zend-Avesta and Über die Seelenfrage. Internet Archive
- (Dr. Mises) Gedichte (1841). Internet Archive (Oxford)
- Ueber das höchste Gut ("Concerning the Highest Good") (1846). Internet Archive (Stanford)
- (Dr. Mises) Nanna oder über das Seelenleben der Pflanzen (1848). 2nd ed., 1899. 3rd ed., 1903. Internet Archive (UMich) 4th ed., 1908. Internet Archive (Harvard)
- Zend-Avesta oder über die Dinge des Himmels und des Jenseits (1851). 3 volumes. 3rd ed., 1906. Google (Harvard)
- Ueber die physikalische und philosophische Atomenlehre (1855). 2nd ed., 1864. Internet Archive (Stanford)
- Professor Schleiden und der Mond (1856). Google (UMich)
- Elemente der Psychophysik (1860). 2 volumes. Volume 1. Google (ULausanne) Volume 2. Internet Archive (NYPL)
  - English translation of vol. 1 of the first 1860 edition: Elements of Psychophysics, Trans. Helmut E. Adler, Ed. Davis H. Howes & Edwin G. Boring. Holt, Rinehart and Winston Inc., 1966. Internet Archive
- Ueber die Seelenfrage ("Concerning the Soul") (1861). Internet Archive (NYPL) — Internet Archive (UCal) — Internet Archive (UMich) 2nd ed., 1907. Google (Harvard)
- Die drei Motive und Gründe des Glaubens ("The three motives and reasons of faith") (1863). Google (Harvard) — Internet Archive (NYPL)
- Einige Ideen zur Schöpfungs- und Entwickelungsgeschichte der Organismen (1873). Internet Archive (UMich)
- (Dr. Mises) Kleine Schriften (1875). Internet Archive (UMich)
- Erinnerungen an die letzen Tage der Odlehre und ihres Urhebers (1876). Google (Harvard)
- Vorschule der Aesthetik (1876). 2 Volumes. Internet Archive (Harvard)
- In Sachen der Psychophysik (1877). Internet Archive (Stanford)
- Die Tagesansicht gegenüber der Nachtansicht (1879). Google (Oxford) 2nd ed., 1904. Internet Archive (Stanford)
- Revision der Hauptpuncte der Psychophysik (1882). Internet Archive (Harvard)
- Kollektivmasslehre (1897). Internet Archive (NYPL)

== See also ==
- Friedrich Paulsen
