= Sleep inertia =

Impaired physiological state after awaking

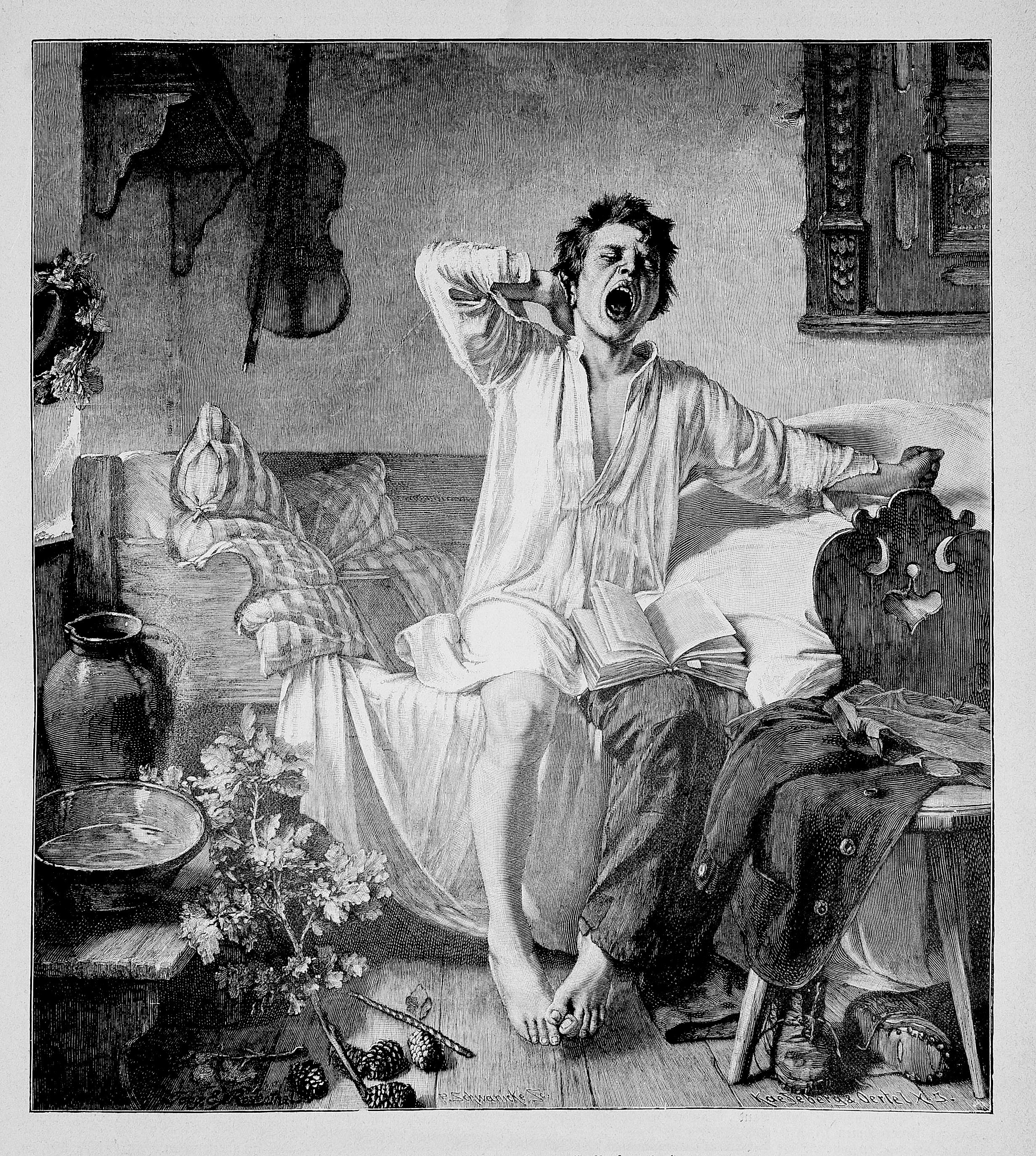
“The early bird catches the worm” After a painting by Toby E. Rosenthal.

Sleep inertia is a physiological state of impaired cognitive and sensory-motor performance that is present immediately after awakening. It persists during the transition from sleep to wakefulness, where an individual will experience feelings of drowsiness, disorientation and a decline in motor dexterity. Impairment from sleep inertia may take several hours to dissipate. In the majority of cases, morning sleep inertia is experienced for 15 to 30 minutes after waking.

Sleep inertia can impair decision-making abilities, safety-critical tasks and the ability to operate efficiently soon after awakening. In these situations, it poses an occupational hazard due to the cognitive and motor deficits that may be present.

== Symptoms ==
- "Grogginess", as defined by a drowsy or disoriented state in which there is a dampening of sensory acuity and mental processing.
- Impaired motor dexterity and decrease in cognitive ability. These gross impairments may be responsible for the associated increase in reaction time and drop in attentiveness.
- Deficits in spatial memory
- Reports of heightened subjective fatigue
- Reduced vigilance and a desire to go back to sleep

These symptoms are expressed with the greatest intensity immediately after waking, and dissipate following a period of extended wakefulness. The duration of symptoms varies on a conditional basis, with primary expression during the first 15–60 minutes after waking and potentially extending for several hours. Tasks that require more complex cognitive operations will feature greater deficits as compared to a simple motor task; the accuracy of sensory and motor functioning is more impaired by sleep inertia as compared to sheer speed. In order to measure the cognitive and motor deficiencies associated with sleep inertia, a battery of tests may be utilized, including: the psychomotor vigilance task, descending subtraction task (DST), auditory reaction time task, and the finger tapping task.

== Causes ==
Studies have shown that abrupt awakening during stage 3 sleep, slow-wave sleep (SWS), produces more sleep inertia than awakening during sleep stages 1, 2 or REM sleep. Prior sleep deprivation increases the percentage of time spent in slow-wave sleep (SWS). Therefore, an individual who was previously sleep deprived will have a greater chance of experiencing sleep inertia. Adenosine levels in the brain progressively increase with sleep deprivation, and return to normal during sleep. Upon awakening with sleep deprivation, high amounts of adenosine will be bound to receptors in the brain, neural activity slows down, and a feeling of tiredness will result.

Individuals express a lack of blood flow to the brain upon awakening. Levels of cerebral blood flow (CBF) and cerebral blood flow velocities (CBFV) will take up to 30 minutes to increase and reach daytime levels. Cerebral blood flow returns to waking levels in the brainstem and thalamus first. After 15 minutes, the brain's anterior cortical regions receive normal daytime blood flow. This 15 minute time period corresponds to the sleep inertia period. Additionally, alcoholic beverages in the evening can cause physiological distress upon wake up.

== Treatments and countermeasures ==
There has been a great deal of research into potential methods to relieve the effects of sleep inertia. The demand for remedies is driven by the occupational hazards of sleep inertia for employees who work extended shifts such as medical professionals, emergency responders, or military personnel. The motor functioning and cognitive ability of these professionals who must immediately respond to a call can pose a safety hazard in the workplace. Below are some of the various methods that have been suggested to combat sleep inertia.

=== Napping ===
When a person is sleep deprived, re-entering sleep may provide a viable route to reduce mental and physical fatigue, but it can also induce sleep inertia. In order to limit sleep inertia, one should avoid waking from the deeper stages of slow-wave sleep. The onset of slow-wave sleep occurs approximately 30 minutes after falling asleep, therefore a nap should be limited to under 30 minutes to prevent waking during slow-wave sleep and enhancing sleep inertia. Furthermore, self-awakening from a short nap was shown to relieve disorientation of sleep inertia as opposed to a forced awakening, but these results may warrant more research into the nature of arousal after sleep periods.

=== Caffeine ===
Caffeine is a xanthine derivative that can cross the blood–brain barrier, as well as the most widely-consumed stimulant compound, present in therapeutic quantities in a variety of food and drink, including tea, coffee, soft drinks and chocolate. The caffeine present in coffee or tea exerts its stimulating action by blocking adenosine receptors in the brain. By antagonizing the adenosine receptors, caffeine limits the effects of adenosine buildup in the brain and increases alertness and attentiveness. Previous research has shown that coupled with a short nap, consuming caffeine prior to the nap can alleviate the effects of sleep inertia. Alternatively, consumption of caffeine immediately after waking up may still result in sleep inertia. This is due to caffeine needing 30 to 60 minutes to reach its peak strength onto the brain. On average, sleep inertia lasts 15 to 30 minutes, meaning that the caffeine may miss the timeframe to alleviate symptoms. Nonetheless, individual degree of consumption and tolerance to caffeine may be responsible for variation in its efficacy to reduce sleep inertia symptoms.

=== Light ===
The natural light provided by the sunrise may contribute to a reduction in sleep inertia effects. Research simulating increase of light at dawn was shown to potentiate the cortisol awakening response (CAR). The CAR is a spike in blood cortisol levels following awakening, and is associated with the return to an alert cognitive state. This response appears to be stronger when there is light exposure directly after awakening, thus decreasing the sleep inertia period.

=== Sound ===
There is moderate evidence that the presence of mild sounds may reverse sleep inertia symptoms. Sound, especially music, is thought to increase attentiveness and decrease one's subjective feeling of sleepiness upon awakening. Research shows that adults may decrease the time of their sleep inertia if they wake up to popular music or melodic alarms.

=== Other ===
Some other interventions that could potentially minimize the effects of sleep inertia are temperature and exercise. A sharp decrease in the temperature of the extremities may prevent heat loss upon awakening, facilitating the return of core body temperature to homeostatic daytime levels. Also, exercise could be a way to combat sleep inertia.

== See also ==
- Circadian rhythm sleep disorder
- Delayed sleep phase syndrome
- Shift work
- Confusional arousals
