= Nonprimary motor cortex =

Region in the human brain

Nonprimary motor cortex is a functionally defined portion of the frontal lobe. It includes two subdivisions, the premotor cortex and the supplementary motor cortex. Largely coincident with the cytoarchitecturally defined area 6 of Brodmann (human), it is located primarily in the rostral portion of the precentral gyrus and caudal portions of the superior frontal gyrus and the middle frontal gyrus. It aids in cerebral control of movement. Anatomically speaking, several nonprimary areas exist, and make direct connections with the spinal cord.

== Function ==
The nonprimary motor cortex exerts its motor control at a higher neural level than the primary motor cortex by commanding the laterality of muscular motor response to the brain. This is carried out by afferent nerves from the nonprimary motor cortex synapsing at the primary motor cortex. Both divisions of the nonprimary motor cortex receive inputs from the thalamus and are responsible for sensory guidance and motor preparation.

== Supplementary Motor Cortex ==
The supplementary portion receives inputs from the thalamus. The thalamic nuclei supplying the supplementary motor cortex are distinct from those enervating the primary motor cortex. (Trends in Neurosciences) It is located above the cingulate sulcus inside the anterior paracentral lobule.

== Premotor Cortex ==
Neural information to the premotor cortex is supplied by the cerebellum. It is located dorsally in and around the precentral sulcus. Laterally, this exists at the dorso-ventral level of the hand in the motor cortex. A ventral region may also exist, but its exact anatomical location is disputed. Like the primary motor cortex, corticospinal tracts begin in the premotor area.
