= Żarki Wielkie =

- Village
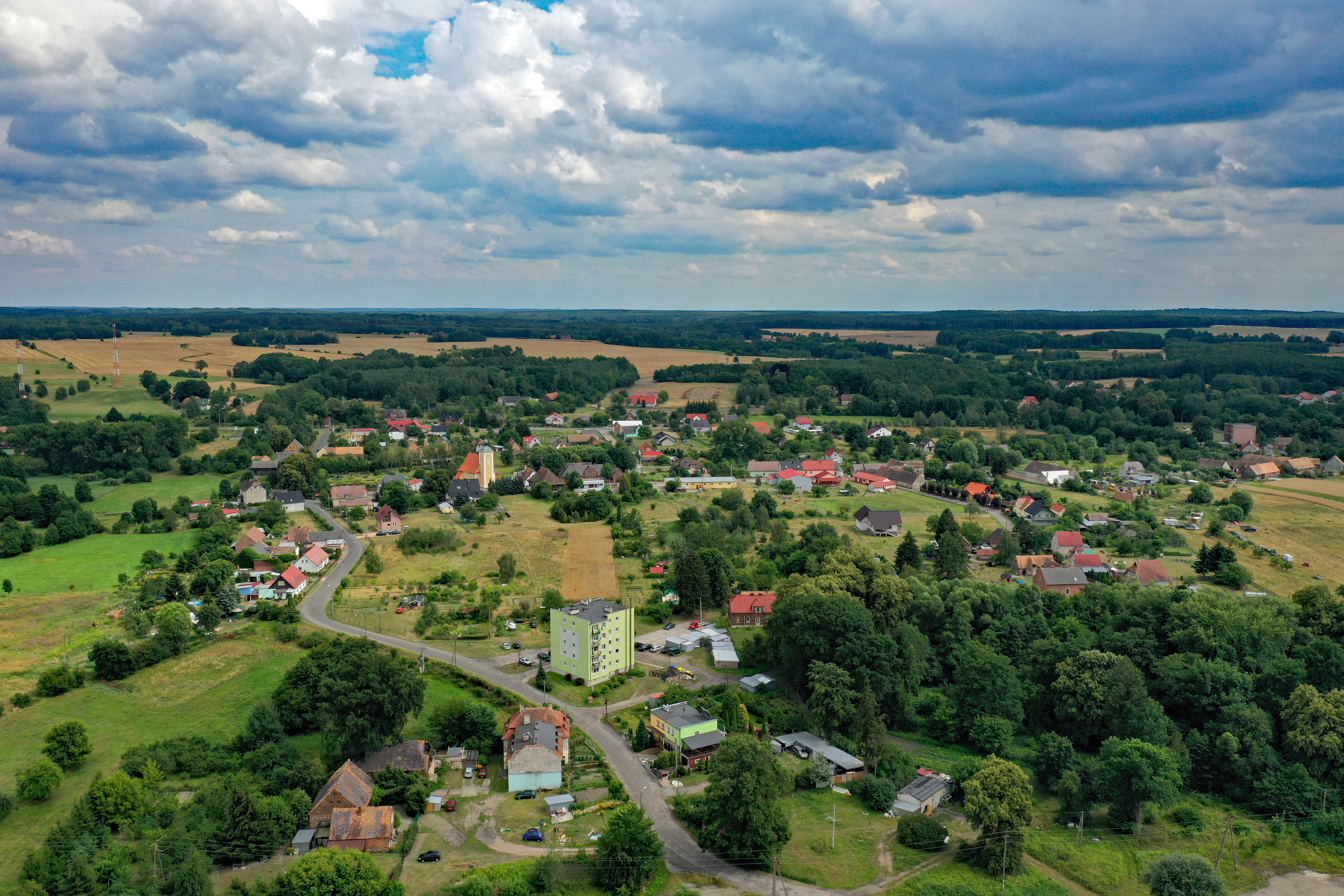

- Location within Poland
- Coordinates: 51°35′30″N 14°45′30″E
- Country: Poland
- Voivodeship: Lubusz
- County: Żary
- Gmina: Trzebiel

Żarki Wielkie [ˈʐarki ˈvjɛlkʲɛ] (Lower Sorbian: Wjelike Żarki; Upper Sorbian: Wjelike Žarki) is a village in the administrative district of Gmina Trzebiel, within Żary County, Lubusz Voivodeship, in western Poland, close to the German border.

== Notable residents ==
- Eduard Clemens Fechner (1799-1861), German artist
- Gustav Fechner (1801-1887), German philosopher
