= Eduard Clemens Fechner =

German painter (1799–1861)

Eduard Clemens Fechner (21 August 1799 – 7 February 1861) was a German portrait painter and printmaker.

Fechner was born at Gross Särchen, near Bad Muskau, and studied in 1814 at Dresden under Grassi and Retsch. In 1820 he went to Munich, where he improved his style under Stieler. He worked some time for the Duke of Leuchtenberg, and visited Paris in 1826. He excelled in painting portraits of ladies and children; he also executed eleven etchings in a spirited manner. He died in Paris, aged 61.

Fechner was the brother of experimental psychology pioneer and founder of psychophysics, Gustav Fechner. His sister, Clementine Wieck Fechner, was the stepmother of Clara Schumann née Wieck, the famous pianist and composer, once Clementine married her father, Friedrich Wieck.

== See also ==
- List of German painters
