= Avralize =

German metalcore band

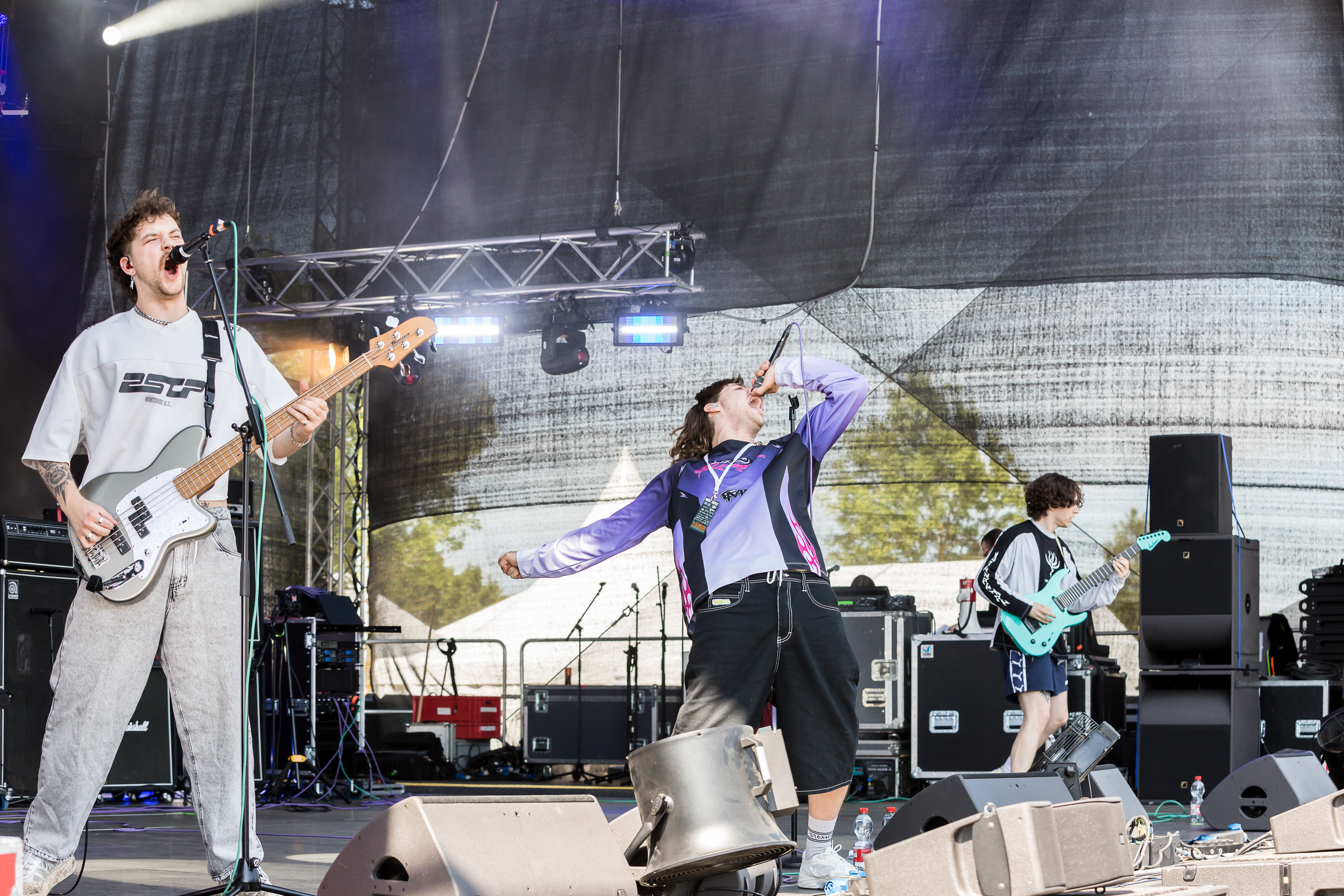
- Avralize at the Metal Frenzy Open Air 2025 in Gardelegen, Germany

Background information
- Origin: Rottweil, Baden-Württemberg, Germany
- Genres: Metalcore
- Years active: 2023–present
- Label: Arising Empire
- Members: Severin Sailer (Vocals); Philipp Tenbergen (Guitar); Valentin Noack (Bass); Bastian Gölz (Drums)
- Website: avralize.com

Avralize is a German metalcore band based out of Rottweil, Baden-Württemberg formed in 2023.

== Biography ==
=== Silent Fox ===
Singer Severin Sailer and drummer Bastian Gölz first met in 2013 at the age of 10 through their shared guitar and drum teacher. Shortly afterward, they founded the cover band Silent Fox. After undergoing some lineup changes, the band was formed with the addition of guitarist Philipp Tenberken and bassist Valentin Noack. In 2020, still under their old name, the band won the SchoolJam newcomer competition and, due to the pandemic, performed at the Hurricane Festival and Southside two years later. In February 2021, the band released their debut EP, Into Darkness.

=== Formation ===
In 2023, the band decided to change their name. They came up with the name "Avralize" after combing through a website with English words online, where they came across the word "auralize" (meaning making something audible). Since this name was already in use by another band, they simply replaced the "u" with a "v". In January 2024, the band was signed by German record label Arising Empire. On March 22, 2024, the band released their debut album, Freaks, produced by Manuel Renner. In the summer of the same year, the band performed at the Traffic Jam Open Air festival. In the summer of 2025, Avralize played at the Wacken Open Air and the Summer Breeze Open Air festivals. On November 14, 2025, their second studio album, Liminal, was released. In 2026, Avralize was featured as a guest artist for German metalcore act THE NARRATOR in the music video for Stasis.

== Musical Style ==
Avralize play a blend of metalcore and electronic music. The band was compared to Northlane and Bring Me the Horizon, who also “refused to follow rules and limitations.”

== Discography ==
=== As Silent Fox ===
==== EPs ====
- Into Darkness (2021)

=== As Avralize ===
==== Albums ====
- Freaks (Arising Empire) (2024)
- Liminal (Arising Empire) (2025)

==== As a Featured Artist ====
- Stasis (by THE NARRATOR) (Nuclear Blast Records) (2026)
