= Liminal (Avralize album) =

liminal

Studio album by Avralize
- Released: November 14, 2025
- Recorded: 2024–2025
- Genre: Metalcore; electronic music
- Length: 38:13
- Label: Arising Empire
- Producer: Bastian Gölz; Manuel Renner

Avralize chronology
| Freaks (2024) | liminal (2025) |

Singles from liminal
- 1. "upside down" Released: September 20, 2024; 2. "wanderlust" Released: January 16, 2025; 3. "helium" Released: May 9, 2025; 4. "close to you" Released: June 20, 2025; 5. "medicine" Released: August 8, 2025; 6. "bite my tongue" Released: September 12, 2025; 7. "liminal" Released: October 24, 2025

Liminal, stylized as liminal, is the second studio album released by German metalcore band Avralize. It was released on November 14, 2025, through Arising Empire and was produced by Bastian Gölz and Manuel Renner.

== Background and promotion ==
Shortly after the release of their debut album Freaks, Avralize released several singles, initially unattached to any album, from September 2024 to June 2025. Along with the announcement of the single “Medicine”, the band announced their second studio album.

Following this announcement, two more singles were released. "Bite My Tongue" was released on September 12, 2025, and the title track of the album, "Liminal", was released on October 23, 2025.

== Track listing ==
All tracks are written by Avralize.

Liminal track listing
| No. | Title | Length |
|---|---|---|
| 1. | "Medicine" | 3:50 |
| 2. | "Nothing Here Feels Real.wav" | 0:32 |
| 3. | "Wanderlust" | 2:52 |
| 4. | "Open Spaces.wav" | 0:41 |
| 5. | "Close to You" | 3:54 |
| 6. | "Cyanide" | 3:34 |
| 7. | "Childhood.wav" | 0:47 |
| 8. | "Liminal" | 3:14 |
| 9. | "Bite My Tongue" | 3:43 |
| 10. | "Helium" | 3:35 |
| 11. | "Spinning Round and Round.wav" | 0:31 |
| 12. | "Upside Down" | 4:04 |
| 13. | "Like a Boomerang" | 3:54 |
| 14. | "Fading Faster" | 2:56 |
| Total length: | | 38:13 |

== Personnel ==
Credits received from Tidal.

Avralize

- Severin Sailer - vocals, lyrics, composition
- Philipp Tenberken - guitar, composition
- Valentin Noak - bass, composition
- Bastian Gölz - drums, lyrics, composition, production
- Manuel Renner - mixing, production, lyrics
