= Limen =

Threshold of perception or response

In physiology, psychology, or psychophysics, a limen or a liminal point is a sensory threshold of a physiological or psychological response. Such points delineate boundaries of perception; that is, a limen defines a sensory threshold beyond which a particular stimulus becomes perceivable, and below which it remains unperceivable.

Liminal, as an adjective, means situated at a sensory threshold, hence barely perceptible. Subliminal means below perception. The absolute threshold is the lowest amount of sensation detectable by a sense organ.

== See also ==
- Just noticeable difference (least perceptible difference)
- Threshold of pain, the boundary where perception becomes pain
- Weber–Fechner law (Weber's law)
