= Limen insulae =

Neuroanatomical feature

Identifiers
- NeuroNames: 2072
- NeuroLex ID: birnlex_1493
- TA98: A14.1.09.155
- TA2: 5503
- FMA: 75266

The limen insulae forms the junction point between anterior and posterior stem of the lateral sulcus. It is the lateral most limit of the anterior perforated substance and the starting point of the insular cortex.

The limen insulae translates as the threshold to the insula, and is the point at which the insular cortex is continuous with cortex over the amygdala and superior temporal gyrus.
