= Tapping rate =

Psychological test

The tapping rate is a psychological test given to assess the integrity of the neuromuscular system and examine motor control. The finger tapping test has the advantage of being a relatively pure neurologically driven motor task because the inertial and intersegmental interactions are so small that biomechanical influences on movement are reduced. Finger tapping involves three important features: time, spatial amplitude, and frequency. Studies have reported that the average number of taps per 10-second interval can be used to distinguish between patients with mild traumatic brain injury and healthy controls. The tapping rate is slower in people one month after sustaining a mild traumatic brain injury and in experienced boxers and soccer players who frequently "headed" the ball. The speed of finger tapping has also been found to be related to severity of initial traumatic brain injury, and can be used to help assess recovery from mild and moderate traumatic brain injuries.
