= Stanley Smith Stevens =

American psychologist (1906–1973)

- Born: November 4, 1906; Ogden, Utah, U.S.
- Died: January 18, 1973 (aged 66); Vail, Colorado, U.S.
- Education: University of Utah; Stanford University (AB); Harvard University (PhD)
- Spouses: Maxine Leonard (m. 1930, died) Geraldine Stone (m. 1963)
- Children: 1
- Scientific career
- Fields: Psychology; psychoacoustics
- Academic advisors: Hallowell Davis

Stanley Smith Stevens (November 4, 1906 – January 18, 1973) was an American psychologist who founded Harvard's Psycho-Acoustic Laboratory, studying psychoacoustics, and he is credited with the introduction of Stevens's power law. Stevens authored a milestone textbook, the 1400+ page Handbook of Experimental Psychology (1951). He was also one of the founding organizers of the Psychonomic Society. In 1946 he introduced a theory of levels of measurement widely used by scientists but whose use in some areas of statistics has been criticized. In addition, Stevens played a key role in the development of the use of operational definitions in psychology.

A Review of General Psychology survey, published in 2002, ranked Stevens as the 52nd most cited psychologist of the 20th century. He was a member of the American Academy of Arts and Sciences, the United States National Academy of Sciences, and the American Philosophical Society.

== Early life and education ==
Stevens was born in Ogden, Utah, to Stanley and Adeline (Smith) Stevens and educated in Latter-day Saint-affiliated schools in Salt Lake City, Utah. He spent much of his childhood in the polygamous household of his maternal grandfather Orson Smith. At the death of his parents in 1924, he spent the next 3 years on an LDS mission in Switzerland and Belgium.

He attended the University of Utah from 1927 to 1929 and Stanford University for the next two years, graduating with an A.B. in psychology in 1931. Shortly after arriving in Massachusetts to begin a Ph.D., he left the LDS church, but continued to struggle with conflicting ideas of faith and science. After two years of graduate study, he received his Ph.D. in psychology from Harvard University, where he served under Edwin Boring as assistant in psychology, from 1932 to 1934.

The following year he spent studying physiology under Hallowell Davis at Harvard Medical School, and in 1935 served as a research fellow in physics at Harvard for a year. In 1936, Stevens accepted a position as an instructor in experimental psychology at Harvard University.

== Career ==
Stevens' experimental and theoretical work lay primarily in the fields of psychophysics and psychoacoustics. One of his most influential contributions was his definition of a measurement scale defined by four types: Nominal, Ordinal, Interval, and Ratio. (see Level of measurement) He is the author of the operational theory of measurement, which "...in the broadest sense, is defined as the assignment of numerals to objects or events according to rules." In fact, the definition paraphrased Norman Robert Campbell's note from the Final Report of the so-called Ferguson's committee (joint committee of sections A, Mathematical and Physical Sciences, and J, Psychology, of the British Association for the Advancement of Science, held 1932–1940). Stevens just omitted or extended some of Campbell's assumptions. While Campbell considered additivity to be a necessary condition, Stevens considered any rule to fit the definition. His goal was to overcome the committee's conclusion concerning the possibility of measurement in psychology.

=== Science of Science discussion group ===
Stevens played a key role in organising the Science of Science discussion group in Cambridge, Massachusetts, which met on eight occasions from October 1940 to mid-1941. Stevens, who was noted for the clarity of his scientific writing, attracted to the group a number of participants whose aim was the "debabelisation of science". The group was also influenced by the 5th Congress of the Unity of Science, which had been held at Harvard University in September 1939 and featured a number of well-known scientists from different disciplines.

== Personal life and death ==
He married Maxine Leonard in 1930 and had a son, Peter Smith Stevens, in 1936. He married Geraldine Stone, who had worked in the Psycho-Acoustic Laboratory from its inception, in 1963.

He died on January 18, 1973 in Vail, Colorado.

== See also ==
- The Logic of Modern Physics
