= Stevens's power law =

Empirical relationship between actual and perceived changed intensity of stimulus

Stevens' power law is an empirical relationship in psychophysics between an increased intensity or strength in a physical stimulus and the perceived magnitude increase in the sensation created by the stimulus. It is often considered to supersede the Weber–Fechner law, which is based on a logarithmic relationship between stimulus and sensation, because the power law describes a wider range of sensory comparisons, down to zero intensity.

The theory is named after psychophysicist Stanley Smith Stevens (1906–1973). Although the idea of a power law had been suggested by 19th-century researchers, Stevens is credited with reviving the law and publishing a body of psychophysical data to support it in 1957.

The general form of the law is

$$\psi(I) = k I ^a,$$

where I is the intensity or strength of the stimulus in physical units (energy, weight, pressure, mixture proportions, etc.), ψ(I) is the magnitude of the sensation evoked by the stimulus, a is an exponent that depends on the type of stimulation or sensory modality, and k is a proportionality constant that depends on the units used.

A distinction has been made between local psychophysics, where stimuli can only be discriminated with a probability around 50%, and global psychophysics, where the stimuli can be discriminated correctly with near certainty (Luce & Krumhansl, 1988). The Weber–Fechner law and methods described by L. L. Thurstone are generally applied in local psychophysics, whereas Stevens' methods are usually applied in global psychophysics.

== Methods ==
The principal methods used by Stevens to measure the perceived intensity of a stimulus were magnitude estimation and magnitude production. In magnitude estimation with a standard, the experimenter presents a stimulus called a standard and assigns it a number called the modulus. For subsequent stimuli, subjects report numerically their perceived intensity relative to the standard so as to preserve the ratio between the sensations and the numerical estimates (e.g., a sound perceived twice as loud as the standard should be given a number twice the modulus). In magnitude estimation without a standard (usually just magnitude estimation), subjects are free to choose their own standard, assigning any number to the first stimulus and all subsequent ones with the only requirement being that the ratio between sensations and numbers is preserved. In magnitude production a number and a reference stimulus is given and subjects produce a stimulus that is perceived as that number times the reference. Also used is cross-modality matching, which generally involves subjects altering the magnitude of one physical quantity, such as the brightness of a light, so that its perceived intensity is equal to the perceived intensity of another type of quantity, such as warmth or pressure.

== Criticisms ==
Stevens generally collected magnitude estimation data from multiple observers, averaged the data across subjects, and then fitted a power function to the data. Because the fit was generally reasonable, he concluded the power law was correct.

A principal criticism has been that Stevens' approach provides neither a direct test of the power law itself nor the underlying assumptions of the magnitude estimation/production method: it simply fits curves to data points. In addition, the power law can be deduced mathematically from the Weber-Fechner logarithmic function (Mackay, 1963), and the relation makes predictions consistent with data (Staddon, 1978). As with all psychometric studies, Stevens' approach ignores individual differences in the stimulus-sensation relationship, and there are generally large individual differences in this relationship that averaging the data will obscure (Greem & Luce 1974).

Stevens' main assertion was that using magnitude estimations/productions respondents were able to make judgements on a ratio scale (i.e., if x and y are values on a given ratio scale, then there exists a constant k such that x = ky). In the context of axiomatic psychophysics, (Narens 1996) formulated a testable property capturing the implicit underlying assumption this assertion entailed. Specifically, for two proportions p and q, and three stimuli, x, y, z, if y is judged p times x, z is judged q times y, then t = pq times x should be equal to z. This amounts to assuming that respondents interpret numbers in a veridical way. This property was unambiguously rejected (Ellermeier & Faulhammer 2000, Zimmer 2005). Without assuming veridical interpretation of numbers, (Narens 1996) formulated another property that, if sustained, meant that respondents could make ratio scaled judgments, namely, if y is judged p times x, z is judged q times y, and if y' is judged q times x, z' is judged p times y', then z should equal z'. This property has been sustained in a variety of situations (Ellermeier & Faulhammer 2000, Zimmer 2005).

Critics of the power law also point out that the validity of the law is contingent on the measurement of perceived stimulus intensity that is employed in the relevant experiments. Luce (2002), under the condition that respondents' numerical distortion function and the psychophysical functions could be separated, formulated a behavioral condition equivalent to the psychophysical function being a power function. This condition was confirmed for just over half the respondents, and the power form was found to be a reasonable approximation for the rest (Steingrimsson & Luce 2006).

It has also been questioned, particularly in terms of signal detection theory, whether any given stimulus is actually associated with a particular and absolute perceived intensity; i.e. one that is independent of contextual factors and conditions. Consistent with this, Luce (1990, p. 73) observed that "by introducing contexts such as background noise in loudness judgements, the shape of the magnitude estimation functions certainly deviates sharply from a power function". Indeed, nearly all sensory judgments can be changed by the context in which a stimulus is perceived.

== Exponents reported by Stevens ==
Continuum	Exponent ($a$)	Stimulus condition
Loudness	0.67	Sound pressure of 3000 Hz tone
Vibration	0.95	Amplitude of 60 Hz on finger
Vibration	0.6	Amplitude of 250 Hz on finger
Brightness	0.33	5° target in dark
Brightness	0.5	Point source
Brightness	0.5	Brief flash
Brightness	1	Point source briefly flashed
Lightness	1.2	Reflectance of gray papers
Visual length	1	Projected line
Visual area	0.7	Projected square
Redness (saturation)	1.7	Red–gray mixture
Taste	1.3	Sucrose
Taste	1.4	Salt
Taste	0.8	Saccharin
Smell	0.6	Heptane
Cold	1	Metal contact on arm
Warmth	1.6	Metal contact on arm
Warmth	1.3	Irradiation of skin, small area
Warmth	0.7	Irradiation of skin, large area
Discomfort, cold	1.7	Whole-body irradiation
Discomfort, warm	0.7	Whole-body irradiation
Thermal pain	1	Radiant heat on skin
Tactual roughness	1.5	Rubbing emery cloths
Tactual hardness	0.8	Squeezing rubber
Finger span	1.3	Thickness of blocks
Pressure on palm	1.1	Static force on skin
Muscle force	1.7	Static contractions
Heaviness	1.45	Lifted weights
Viscosity	0.42	Stirring silicone fluids
Electric shock	3.5	Current through fingers
Vocal effort	1.1	Vocal sound pressure
Angular acceleration	1.4	5 s rotation
Duration	1.1	White-noise stimuli

== See also ==
- Perception
- Sone
