= R136a1 =

Wolf–Rayet star in the constellation Dorado

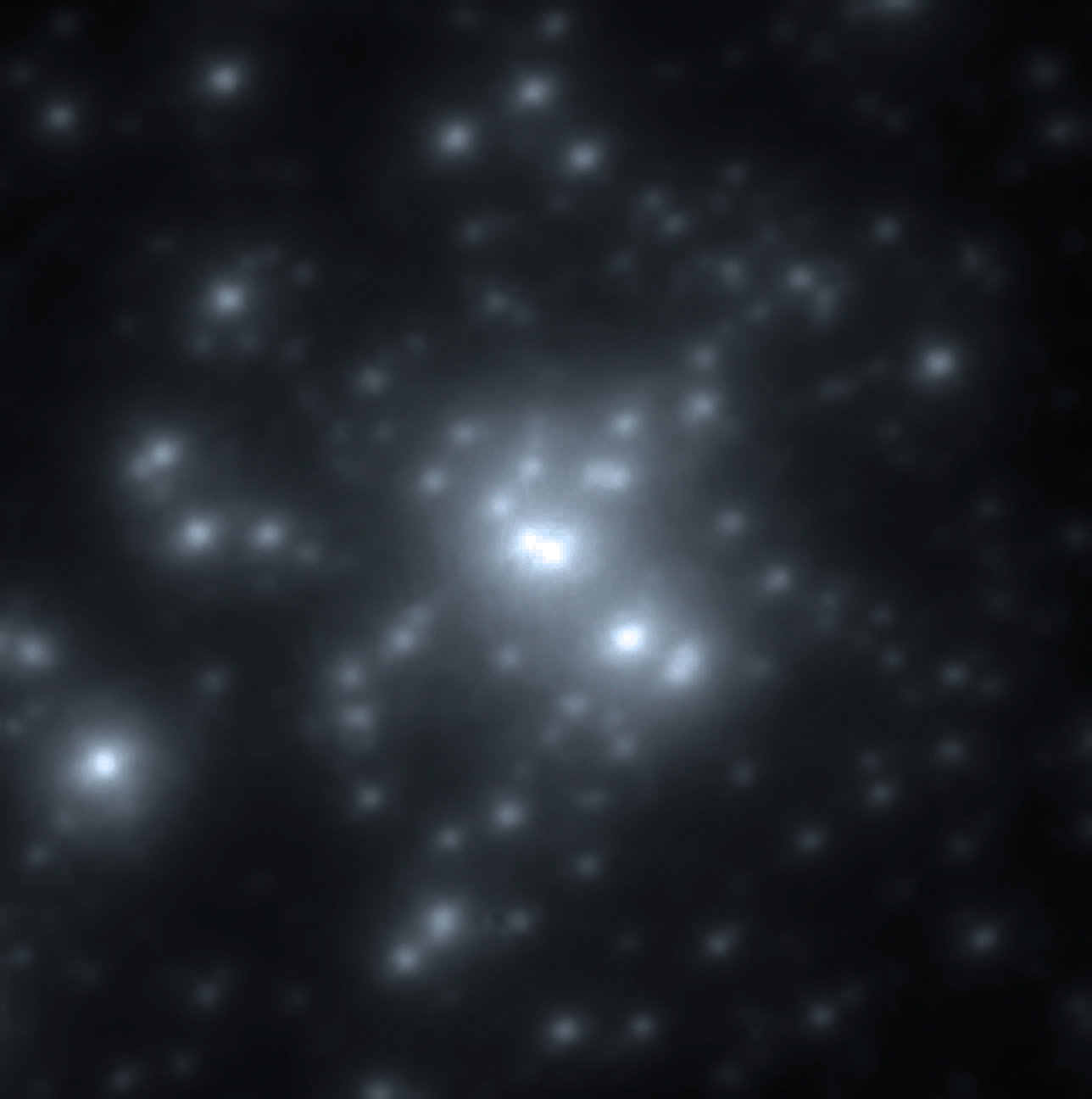
- A near-infrared image of the R136 cluster. R136a1 is at the center with R136a2 close by, R136a3 below right, and R136b to the left. Credit: ESO/VLT

Observation data Epoch J2000.0 Equinox J2000.0
- Constellation: Dorado
- Right ascension: 5^{h} 38^{m} 42.39^{s}
- Declination: −69° 06′ 02.9″
- Apparent magnitude (V): 12.23

Characteristics
- Evolutionary stage: Main sequence
- Spectral type: WN5h
- B−V color index: 0.03

Astrometry
Distance	163,000 ly (49,970 pc)
Absolute magnitude (M_{V})	−8.18

Details
Mass	291±46 M_{☉}
Radius	42.7+1.6 −0.9 R_{☉}
Luminosity	7,240,000+700,000 −1,080,000 L_{☉}
Surface gravity (log g)	3.65±0.20 cgs
Temperature	46,000+1,300 −2,400 K
Rotational velocity (v sin i)	160+160 −90 km/s
Age	1.02±0.16 Myr

Other designations
- BAT99 108, RMC 136a1, HSH95 3, WO84 1b, NGC 2070 MH 498, CHH92 1, P93 954

Database references
SIMBAD	data

R136a1 (short for RMC 136a1) is the most massive and luminous star known, at around 291 solar masses (M_{☉}) and around 7.2 million times the Sun's luminosity (L_{☉}). It is a Wolf–Rayet star at the center of R136, the central concentration of stars of the large NGC 2070 open cluster in the Tarantula Nebula (30 Doradus) in the Large Magellanic Cloud. The cluster can be seen in the far southern celestial hemisphere with binoculars or a small telescope, at magnitude 7.25. R136a1 itself is 100 times fainter than the cluster and can only be resolved using speckle interferometry.

== Discovery ==
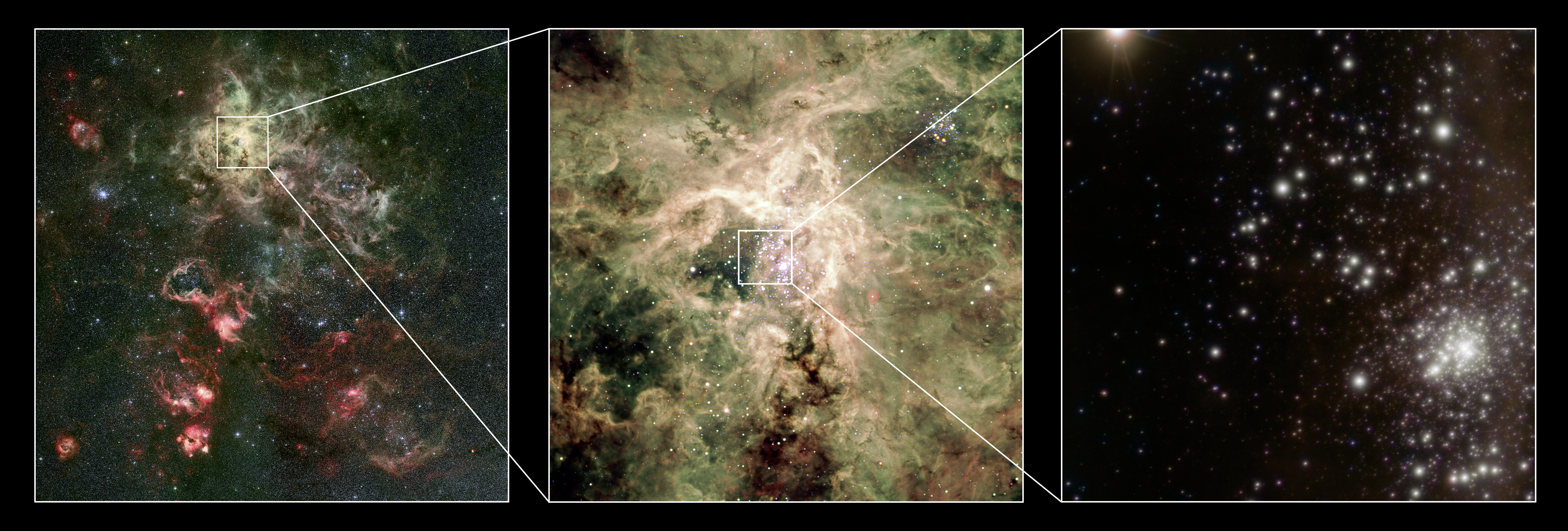
Zooming in from the Tarantula Nebula to the R136 cluster, with R136a1/2/3 visible as the barely resolved knot at bottom right

In 1960, a group of astronomers working at the Radcliffe Observatory in Pretoria made systematic measurements of the brightness and spectra of bright stars in the Large Magellanic Cloud (LMC). Among the objects cataloged was RMC 136 (Radcliffe observatory Magellanic Cloud catalog number 136), the central "star" of the Tarantula Nebula, which the observers concluded was probably a multiple star system. Subsequent observations showed that R136 was located in the middle of a giant region of ionized interstellar hydrogen, known as an H II region, which was a center of intense star formation in the immediate vicinity of the observed stars.

In 1979, ESO's 3.6 m telescope was used to resolve R136 into three components; R136a, R136b, and R136c. The exact nature of R136a was unclear and a subject of intense discussion. Estimates that the brightness of the central region would require as many as 100 hot O class stars within half a parsec at the centre of the cluster led to speculation that a star 3,000 times the mass of the Sun was the more likely explanation.

The first demonstration that R136a was a star cluster was provided by Weigelt and Beier in 1985. Using the speckle interferometry technique, R136a was shown to be made up of 8 stars within 1 arcsecond at the centre of the cluster, with R136a1 being the brightest.

Final confirmation of the nature of R136a came after the launch of the Hubble Space Telescope. Its Wide Field and Planetary Camera (WFPC) resolved R136a into at least 12 components and showed that R136 contained over 200 highly luminous stars. The more advanced WFPC2 allowed the study of 46 massive luminous stars within half a parsec of R136a and over 3,000 stars within a 4.7 parsec radius.

== Visibility ==
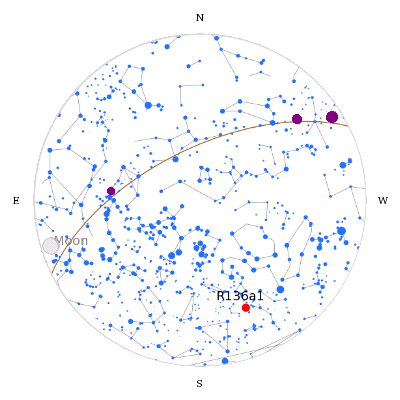
Sky position of R136a1 viewed from Argentina

In the night sky, R136 appears as a 10th magnitude object at the core of the NGC 2070 cluster embedded in the Tarantula Nebula in the Large Magellanic Cloud. It required a 3.6 metre telescope to detect R136a as a component of R136 in 1979, and resolving R136a to detect R136a1 requires a space telescope or sophisticated techniques such as adaptive optics or speckle interferometry.

South of about the 20th parallel south, the LMC is circumpolar, meaning that it can be seen (at least in part) all night every night of the year, weather and light pollution permitting. In the Northern Hemisphere, it can be visible south of the 20th parallel north. This excludes North America (except southern Mexico), Europe, northern Africa and northern Asia.

== Surroundings ==
The R136a system at the core of R136 is a dense luminous knot of stars containing at least 12 stars, the most prominent being R136a1, R136a2, and R136a3, all of which are extremely luminous and massive WN5h stars. R136a1 is separated from R136a2, the second brightest star in the cluster, by 5,000 AU.

R136 is located approximately 157,000 light-years from Earth in the Large Magellanic Cloud, positioned on the south-east corner of the galaxy at the centre of the Tarantula Nebula, also known as 30 Doradus. R136 itself is just the central condensation of the much larger NGC 2070 open cluster. For such a distant star, R136a1 is relatively unobscured by interstellar dust. The reddening causes the visual brightness to be reduced by about 1.8 magnitudes, but only around 0.22 magnitudes in the near infrared.

== Distance ==
The distance to R136a1 cannot be determined directly, but is assumed to be at the same distance as the Large Magellanic Cloud at around 50 kiloparsecs or 163,000 light years.

== Properties ==
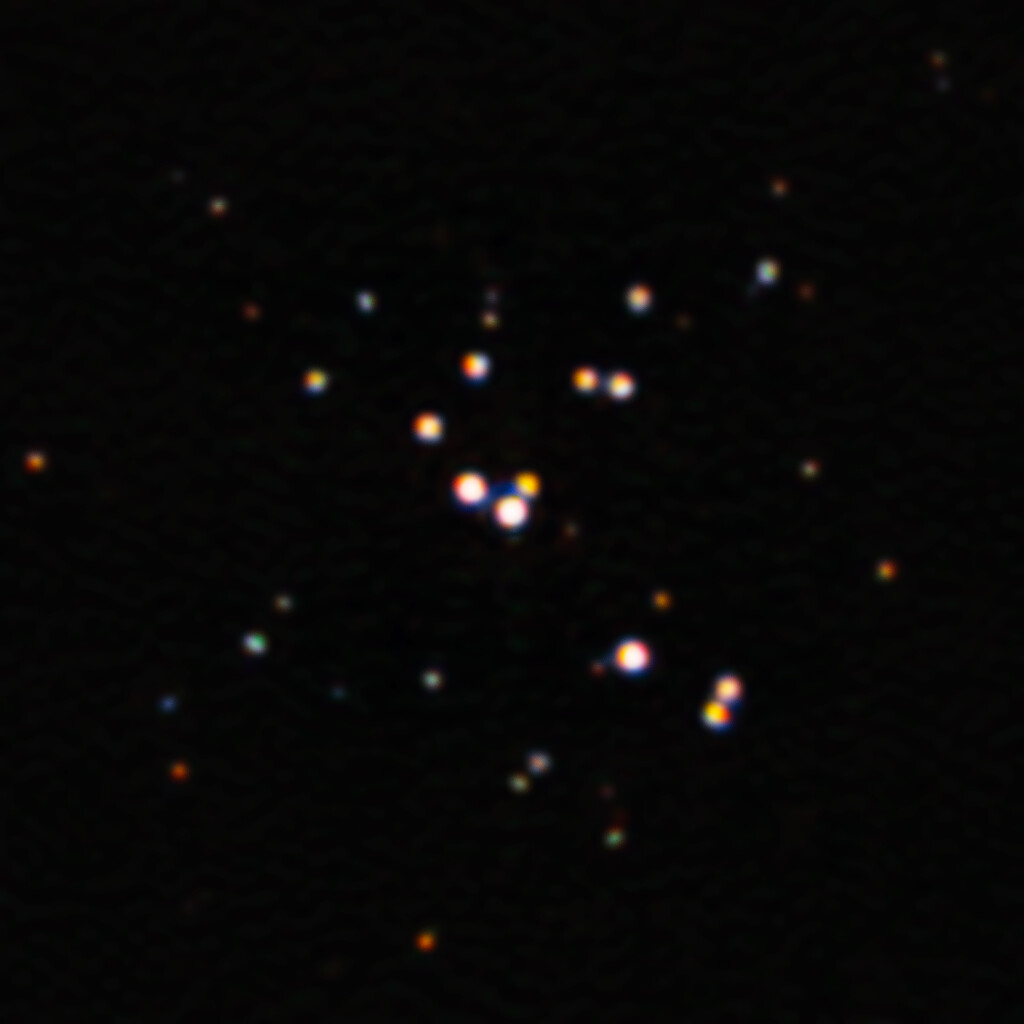
Sharpest image ever of R136a1, right at the centre of this image, resolving a close companion

=== Binary ===
A possible binary companion to R136a1, HSH95-17, has been resolved, although there is a 25% possibility that it is a chance alignment.

X-ray emission was detected from R136 using the Chandra X-ray Observatory. R136a and R136c were both clearly detected, but R136a could not be resolved. Another study separated the R136a1/2 pair from R136a3. R136a1/2 showed relatively soft x-rays not thought to indicate a colliding winds binary.

Rapid Doppler radial velocity variations would be expected from a pair of equal mass stars in a close orbit, but this has not been seen in the R136a1 spectrum. A high orbital inclination, a more distant binary, or a chance alignment of two distant stars cannot be completely ruled out but is thought to be unlikely. Highly unequal binary components are possible, but would not affect the modelling of R136a1's properties.

=== Classification ===
R136a1 is a high-luminosity WN5h star, placing it on the extreme top left corner of the Hertzsprung–Russell diagram. A Wolf–Rayet star is distinguished by the strong, broad emission lines in its spectrum. This includes ionized nitrogen, helium, carbon, oxygen and occasionally silicon, but with hydrogen lines usually weak or absent. A WN5 star is classified on the basis of ionised helium emission being considerably stronger than the neutral helium lines, and having roughly equal emission strength from NIII, NIV, and NV. The "h" in the spectral type indicates significant hydrogen emission in the spectrum, and hydrogen is calculated to make up 40% of the surface abundance by mass.

WNh stars as a class are massive luminous stars still burning hydrogen at their cores. The emission spectrum is produced in a powerful dense stellar wind, and the enhanced levels of helium and nitrogen arise from convectional mixing of CNO cycle products to the surface.

=== Mass ===
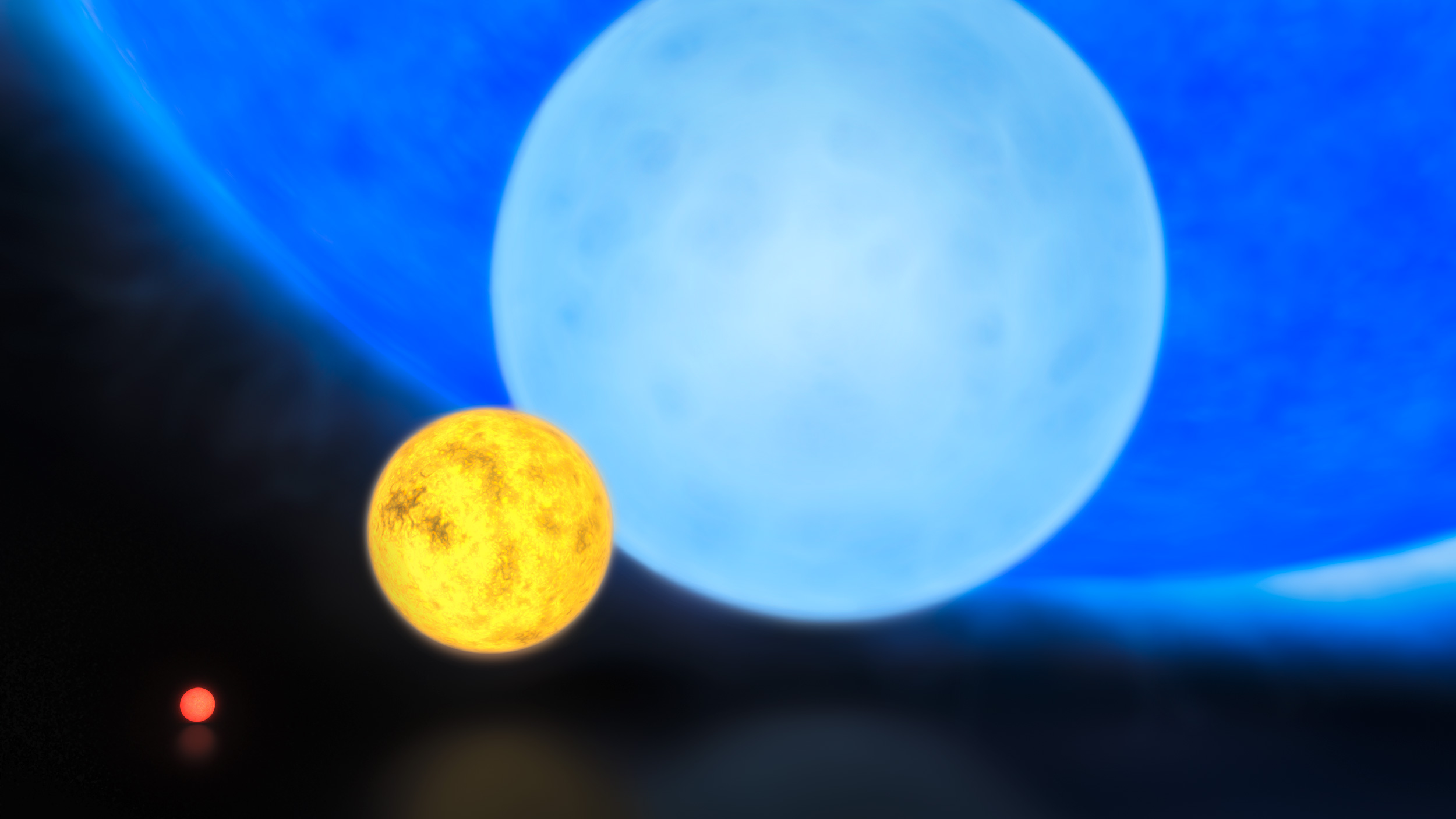
Left to right: a red dwarf, the Sun, a B-type main sequence star, and R136a1

Current estimates, as of 2025, place the mass of R136a1 at around 291 M_{☉}. This estimate relies on the star's helium abundance. Other estimates exist, such as an evolutionary mass of 215 M_{☉} found from HST visual spectra using a non-LTE line-blanketed CMFGEN model atmosphere. R136a1 closely matches the expected properties for an initially rapidly rotating 251 M_{☉} star with LMC metallicity after shining for about a million years.

An earlier analysis using ultraviolet spectroscopy found a current mass of 315 M_{☉} and an initial mass of 325 M_{☉}. A current mass of 256 M_{☉} is found in similar analysis using PoWR (Potsdam Wolf–Rayet) atmospheric models with optical and ultraviolet spectra and a mass–luminosity relation, assuming a single star.

R136a1 is undergoing extreme mass loss through a stellar wind reaching a velocity of 2,600±150 km/s. This is caused by intense electromagnetic radiation from the very hot photosphere accelerating material away from the surface more strongly than gravity can retain it. Mass loss is largest for high-luminosity stars with low surface gravity and enhanced levels of heavy elements in the photosphere. R136a1 loses 1.6×10^{−4} M_{☉} per year (3.21×10^{18} kg/s), over a billion times more than the Sun loses, and is expected to have shed about 55 M_{☉} since its formation.

=== Luminosity ===
At around 7,244,000 L_{☉}, R136a1 is the most luminous star known, radiating more energy in four seconds than the Sun does in a year. From 2010 to 2020 (and in 2025-2026) it was recognized as the most massive and luminous star known. If it replaced the Sun in the Solar System, it would outshine the Sun in visible light by 164,000 times (M_{V} = −8.2), because most of its electromagnetic radiation is UV. It would therefore appear from Earth at magnitude −40. Its brightness at a distance of 10 parsecs, the absolute visual magnitude, would be −8.18, three magnitudes brighter than Venus ever appears from Earth. Its brightness at the distance of the nearest star to Earth, Proxima Centauri (just over a parsec), would be about the same as the full moon.

R136a1 supplies c. 7% of the ionizing flux of the entire 30 Doradus region, as much as 70 O7 main-sequence stars. Along with R136a2, a3, and c, it produces 43–46% of the Lyman continuum radiation of the whole R136 cluster.

Massive stars lie close to the Eddington limit, the luminosity at which the radiation pressure acting outwards at the surface of the star equals the force of the star's gravity pulling it inward. Above the Eddington limit, a star generates so much energy that its outer layers are rapidly thrown off. This effectively restricts stars from shining at higher luminosities for long periods. The classical Eddington luminosity limit is not applicable to stars such as R136a1 that are not in hydrostatic equilibrium, and its calculation is extremely complex for real stars. The empirical Humphrey-Davidson limit has been identified as a luminosity limit for observed stars, but recent models have attempted to calculate useful theoretical Eddington limits applicable to massive stars. R136a1 is currently around 70% of its Eddington luminosity.

=== Temperature ===
The colour of a 46,000 K blackbody

R136a1 has a surface temperature of around 46,000 K (45,700 °C; 82,300 °F), eight times as hot as the Sun, and with peak radiation in the extreme ultraviolet.

R136a1 has a B–V index of about 0.03, which is a typical colour for an F-type star. The "U–V" colour from the HST WFPC2 336 nm and 555 nm filters is −1.28, more indicative of an extremely hot star. This variation of different colour indices relative to a blackbody is the result of interstellar dust causing reddening and extinction. The reddening (E_{B–V}) can be used to estimate the level of visual extinction (A_{V}). E_{B–V} values of 0.29–0.37 have been measured, with considerable uncertainty due to contamination from close neighbours such as R136a2 0.1" away, leading to A_{V} around 1.80 and a de-reddened B–V (B–V_{0}) of −0.30.

The effective temperature of a star can be approximated from the colour, but this is not very accurate and spectral fitting to an atmospheric model is necessary to derive the temperature. Temperatures of 53,000–56,000 K are found for R136a1 using different atmospheric models. Older models had produced temperatures around 45,000 K and hence dramatically lower luminosities. The extreme temperature of the star causes its peak radiation to be around 50 nm and nearly 99% of the radiation to be emitted outside the visual range (a bolometric correction around −5).

=== Size ===
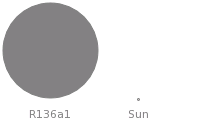
A size comparison between R136a1 and the Sun

R136a1 is over forty times the radius of the Sun (42.7 R_{☉}; 29,700,000 km; 1/5 au) which corresponds to a volume nearly 80,000 times larger than the Sun.

R136a1 does not have a well-defined visible surface like the Earth or the Sun. The hydrostatic main body of the star is surrounded by a dense atmosphere being accelerated outwards into the stellar wind. An arbitrary point within this wind is defined as the surface for measuring the radius, and different authors may use different definitions. For example, a Rosseland optical depth of 2/3 corresponds approximately to a visible surface while a Rosseland depth of 20 or 100 corresponds more closely to a physical photosphere. Stellar temperatures are typically quoted at the same depth so that the radius and temperature correspond to the luminosity.

R136a1's dimensions are far smaller than the largest stars: red supergiants are several hundred to over a thousand R_{☉}, tens of times larger than R136a1. Despite the large mass and modest dimensions, R136a1 has an average density less than 1% of the Sun's. At about 5 kg/m^{3}, it is around 4 times denser than Earth's atmosphere at sea level; alternatively, less than a hundredth the density of water.

=== Rotation ===
The rotation rate of R136a1 cannot be measured directly since the photosphere is hidden by the dense stellar wind and the photospheric absorption lines used to measure rotational doppler broadening are not present in the spectrum. A N_{V} emission line at 2.1 μm is produced relatively deep in the wind and can be used to estimate rotation. In R136a1 it has a FWHM of about 15 Å, indicating a slow or non rotating star, although it could be aligned with its pole facing Earth. R136a2 and a3 are rotating rapidly and the closest evolutionary models for R136a1 match a star still rotating with an equatorial speed of c. 200 km/s after c. 1.75 Myr.

== Evolution ==
=== Current state ===
R136a1 is currently fusing hydrogen to helium, predominantly by the CNO cycle due to the high temperatures at the core. Despite the Wolf–Rayet spectral appearance, it is a young star, just over a million years old. The emission spectrum is created by a dense stellar wind caused by the extreme luminosity, with the enhanced levels of helium and nitrogen being mixed from the core to the surface by strong convection. It is effectively a WR-type main sequence star. Over 90% of the star is convective, with a small non-convective layer at the surface.

=== Development ===
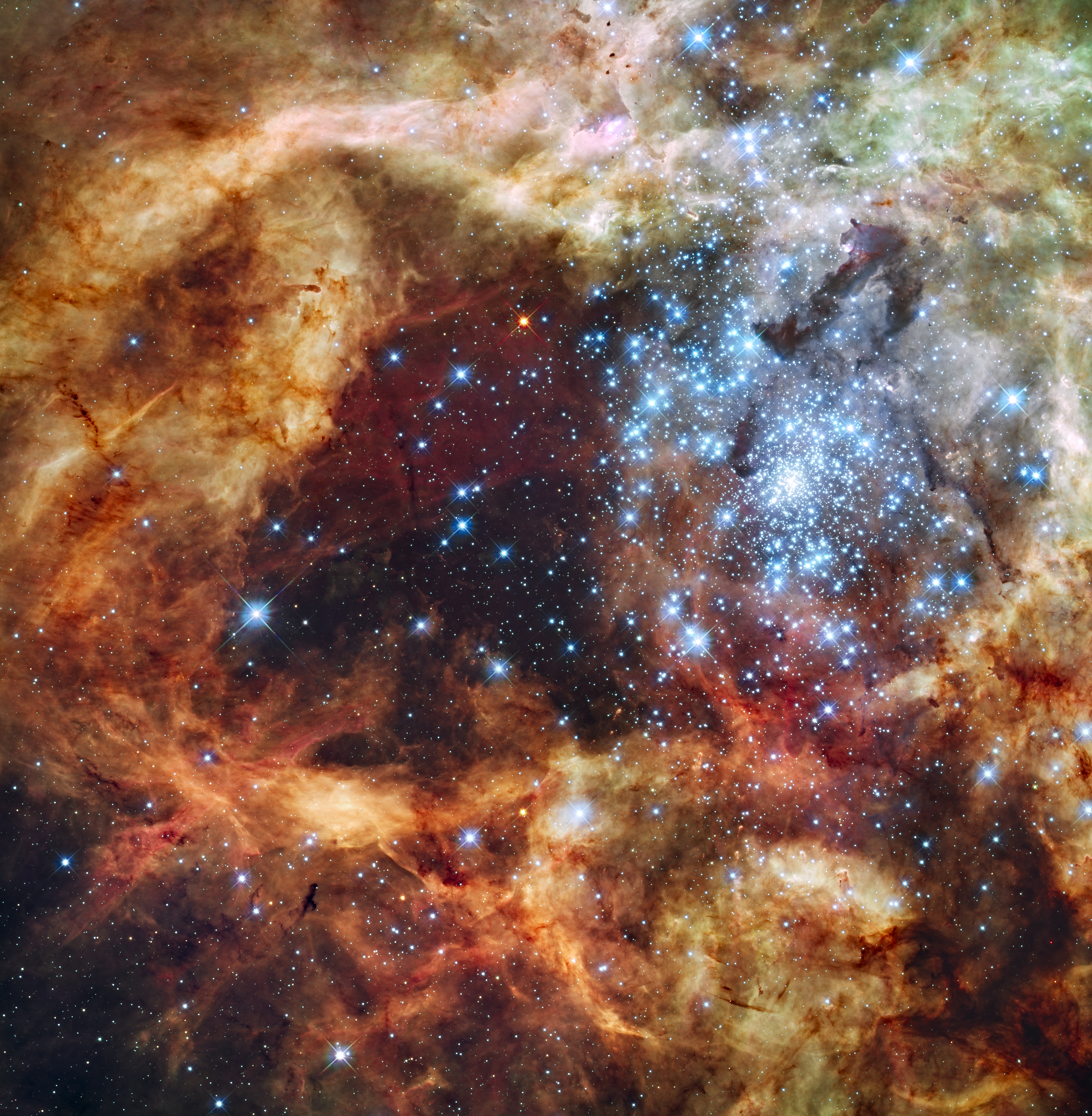
The R136 cluster in a massive star forming region in the LMC

Models of star formation by accretion from molecular clouds predict an upper limit to the mass a star can achieve before its radiation prevents further accretion. The most simplistic accretion models at population I metallicities predict a limit as low as 40 M_{☉}, but more complex theories allow masses several times higher. An empirical limit of around 150 M_{☉} has become widely accepted. R136a1 clearly exceeds all these limits, leading to development of new single star accretion models potentially removing the upper limit, and the potential for massive star formation by stellar mergers.

As a single star formed from accretion, the properties of such a massive star are still uncertain. Synthetic spectra indicate that it would never have a main sequence luminosity class (V), or even a normal O type spectrum. The high luminosity, proximity to the Eddington limit, and strong stellar wind, would be likely to create an If* or WNh spectrum as soon as R136a1 became visible as a star. Helium and nitrogen are rapidly mixed to the surface due to the large convective core and high mass loss, and their presence in the stellar wind creates the characteristic Wolf–Rayet emission spectrum. The ZAMS at very high masses curves back to cooler temperatures, and at LMC metallicities the maximum temperature predicted to be around 56,000 K for 150–200 M_{☉} stars, so R136a1 would have been slightly cooler than some less massive main sequence stars.

During core hydrogen burning, the helium fraction in the core increases and according to the virial theorem the core pressure and temperature will increase. This leads to an increase in luminosity so that R136a1 is somewhat more luminous now than when it first formed. The temperature decreases slightly, but the outer layers of the star have inflated, driving even higher mass loss.

=== Future ===
The future development of R136a1 is uncertain, and there are no comparable stars to confirm predictions. The evolution of massive stars depends critically on the amount of mass they can lose, and various models give different results, none of which entirely match observations. It is thought that WNh stars develop into LBVs as hydrogen at the core starts to become depleted. This is an important phase of extreme mass loss which enables a star, at near solar metallicity, to transition to a hydrogen-free Wolf–Rayet star. Stars with sufficiently strong mixing from the core to the surface, due to the very large convective core, high metallicity, or additional rotational mixing, may skip the LBV phase and evolve directly from the hydrogen-rich WNh phase to the hydrogen-poor WN phase. Hydrogen fusion lasts for a little over two million years, and the star's mass at the end is expected to be 70–80 M_{☉}. A single star with LMC metallicity, even if it starts out rotating very rapidly, will be braked to near zero rotation by the end of hydrogen burning.

After core helium fusion starts, the remaining hydrogen in the atmosphere is rapidly lost and R136a1 will quickly contract to a hydrogen-free WNE star and the luminosity will decrease. Wolf–Rayet stars at this point are mostly helium and they lie on the Zero Age Helium Main Sequence (He-ZAMS), analogous to and parallel to the hydrogen-burning main sequence but at hotter temperatures.

During helium burning, carbon and oxygen will accumulate in the core and heavy mass loss continues. This eventually leads to the development of a WC spectrum, although at LMC metallicity a star is expected to spend most of the helium burning phase with a WN spectrum. Towards the end of helium burning, core temperature increase and mass loss cause an increase in both luminosity and temperature, with the spectral type becoming WO. Several hundred thousand years will be spent fusing helium, but the final stages of heavier element burning take no more than a few thousand years. R136a1 will eventually shrink to a little over 50 M_{☉}, with just 0.5 M_{☉} of helium left surrounding the core.

=== Supernova ===
Predicted supernova remnants by star initial mass and metallicity

Any star which produces a carbon–oxygen (C–O) core more massive than the maximum for a white dwarf (c. 1.4 M_{☉}) will inevitably suffer core collapse. This usually happens when an iron core has been produced and fusion can no longer produce the energy required to prevent core collapse, although it can happen in other circumstances.

A C–O core between about 64 M_{☉} and 133 M_{☉} will become so hot that the gamma radiation will spontaneously produce electron–positron pairs and the sudden loss of energy in the core will cause it to collapse as a pair-instability supernova (PISN), sometimes called a pair-creation supernova (PCSN). A PISN is usually only produced in very low metallicity stars that do not lose sufficient mass to keep their C–O core sizes below 64 M_{☉}. This can also occur at LMC metallicity for very massive stars, but the predicted C–O core size for R136a1 is below 50 M_{☉} so a PISN is unlikely.

Iron core collapse may produce a supernova explosion, and sometimes a gamma-ray burst (GRB). The type of any supernova explosion will be a Type I since the star has no hydrogen; Type Ic since it has almost no helium. Particularly massive iron cores may collapse the entire star into a black hole with no visible explosion, or a sub-luminous supernova as radioactive ^{56}Ni falls back onto the black hole.

A Type Ic supernova can produce a GRB if the star is rotating and has an appropriate mass. R136a1 is expected to lose almost all its spin long before core collapse so a GRB is unlikely.

The remnant from a Type Ic core collapse supernova is either a neutron star or black hole, depending on the mass of the progenitor core. For a star as massive as R136a1, the remnant will very likely be a black hole instead of a neutron star.

== See also ==
- BAT99-98, one of the most massive stars
- Hypergiant
- VY Canis Majoris, one of the largest stars and galactic red supergiants
- WOH G64 A, the largest star known in the Large Magellanic Cloud and possibly the largest known overall
- WR 102, one of the hottest non-degenerate stars
