= R136a2 =

Star in the constellation Dorado

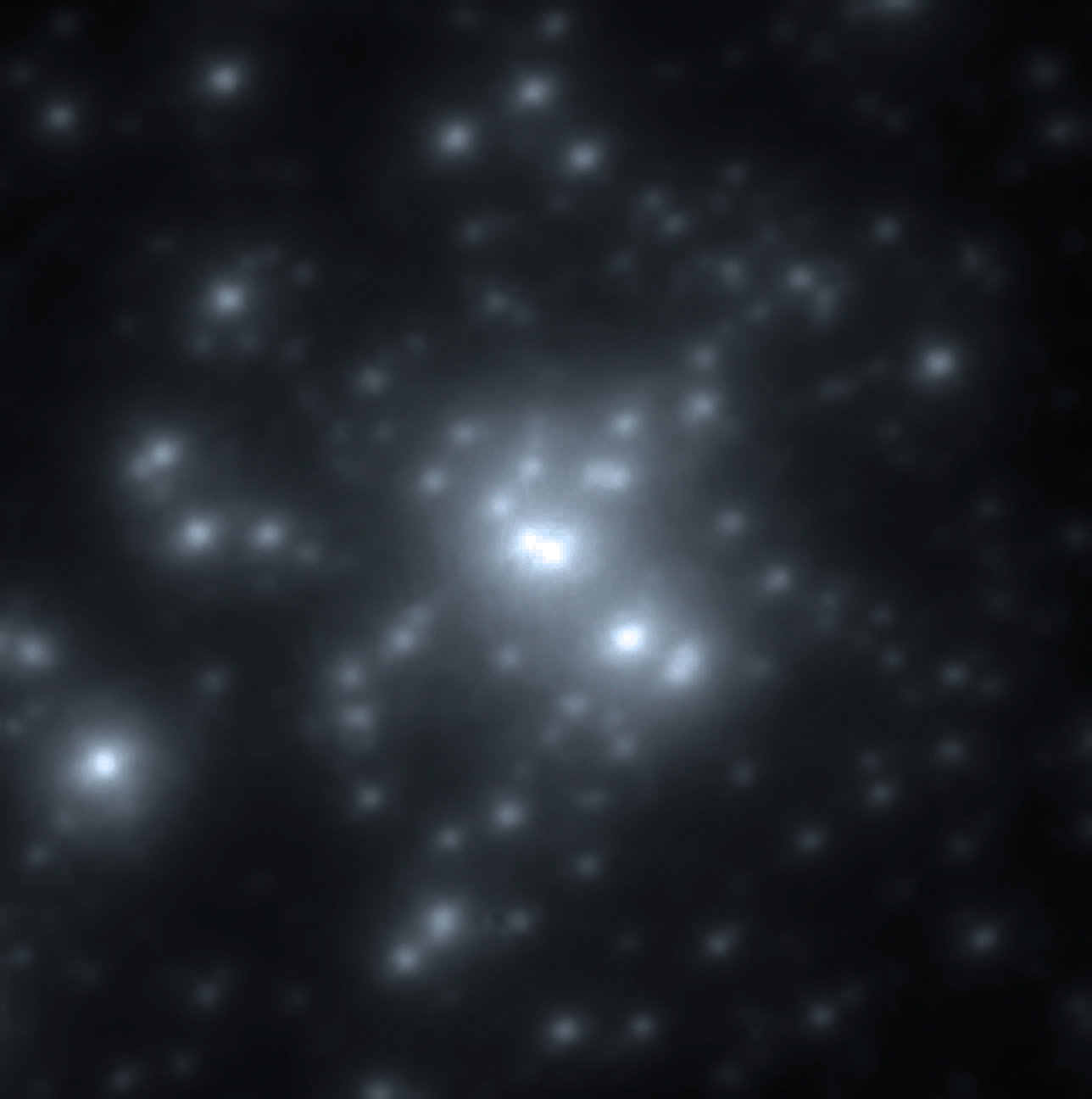
- The central region of the R136 star cluster as seen in near infrared. R136a1 and R136a2 are the two very close bright stars at the center, with R136a2 being the fainter of the two. Credit: ESO

Observation data Epoch J2000 Equinox J2000
- Constellation: Dorado
- Right ascension: 05^{h} 38^{m} 42.40^{s}
- Declination: −69° 06′ 02.9″
- Apparent magnitude (V): 12.34

Characteristics
- Evolutionary stage: main sequence
- Spectral type: WN5h
- B−V color index: 0.23

Astrometry
Distance	163,000 ly (50,000 pc)
Absolute magnitude (M_{V})	−7.80
Absolute bolometric magnitude (M_{bol})	−12.0

Details
Mass	195±35 M_{☉}
Radius	34.7+0.7 −0.8 R_{☉}
Luminosity	5,250,000+370,000 −340,000 L_{☉}
Surface gravity (log g)	3.55+0.25 −0.05 cgs
Temperature	47,000+1,000 −600 K
Age	1.45±0.11 Myr

Other designations
- MH 511, RMC 136a2, HSH95 5, BAT99 109, CHH92 2

Database references
SIMBAD	data

R136a2 (RMC 136a2) is a Wolf-Rayet star residing near the center of the R136, the central concentration of stars of the large NGC 2070 open cluster in the Tarantula Nebula, a massive H II region in the Large Magellanic Cloud which is a nearby satellite galaxy of the Milky Way. It has one of the highest confirmed masses and luminosities of any known star, at about 195 M_{☉} and =5.25 million L_{☉} respectively.

== Discovery ==
In 1960, a group of astronomers working at the Radcliffe Observatory in Pretoria made systematic measurements of the brightness and spectra of bright stars in the Large Magellanic Cloud. Among the objects cataloged was RMC 136, (Radcliffe Observatory Magellanic Cloud Catalogue, Catalog number 136) the central "star" of 30 Doradus. Subsequent observations showed that R136 was located in the center of a giant H II region that was a center of intense star formation in the immediate vicinity of the observed stars.

In the early 1980s, R136a was first resolved using speckle interferometry into 8 components. R136a2 was marginally the second brightest found within 1 arc-second at the centre of the R136 cluster. Previous estimates that the brightness of the central region would require as many as 30 hot O class stars within half a parsec at the centre of the cluster had led to speculation that a star several thousand times the mass of the sun was the more likely explanation. Instead it was eventually found that it consisted of a few extremely luminous stars accompanied by a larger number of hot O stars.

== Distance ==
Determining a precise distance to R136a2 is challenging due to many factors. At the immense distance to the LMC, the parallax method is beyond the limits of current technology. Most estimates assume that R136 is at the same distance as the Large Magellanic Cloud. The most accurate distance to the LMC is 49.97 kpc, derived from a comparison of the angular and linear dimensions of eclipsing binary stars.

== Properties ==
Like all Wolf-Rayet stars, R136a2 is undergoing severe mass loss by a fast stellar wind. The star loses 4.6×10^{−5} solar masses per year through a stellar wind with a speed of 2,400 km/s. The high mass of the star compresses and heats the core and promotes rapid hydrogen fusion predominantly through the CNO process, leading to a luminosity of 5,129,000 L_{☉}. The fusion rate is so great that in 10 seconds R136a2 produces more energy than the Sun does in a year. The star is currently evolving towards hotter temperatures, and is predicted to have started its life with a mass over 500 M_{☉}.

Although the star is one of the most massive known it has a radius of 34.7 R_{☉} and a volume of 41,800 suns, far smaller than the largest stars such as VY Canis Majoris. Because of the high temperature, it emits most of its energy in the ultraviolet region of the electromagnetic spectrum, and the visual brightness is only 114,000 times the sun (M_{V} −7.80).

== Fate ==
It is thought that stars this massive can never lose enough mass to avoid a catastrophic end with the collapse of a large iron core. The result will be a supernova, hypernova, gamma-ray burst, or perhaps almost no visible explosion, and leaving behind a black hole. The exact details depend heavily on the timing and amount of mass loss, with current models not fully reproducing the distribution of stars and supernovae that we observe. The most massive stars in the local universe are expected to progress to hydrogen-free Wolf Rayet stars before their cores collapse, producing a Type Ib or Ic supernova and leaving behind a black hole. Gamma ray bursts are only expected under unusual conditions, or for less massive stars.
