= R136a3 =

Star in the constellation Dorado

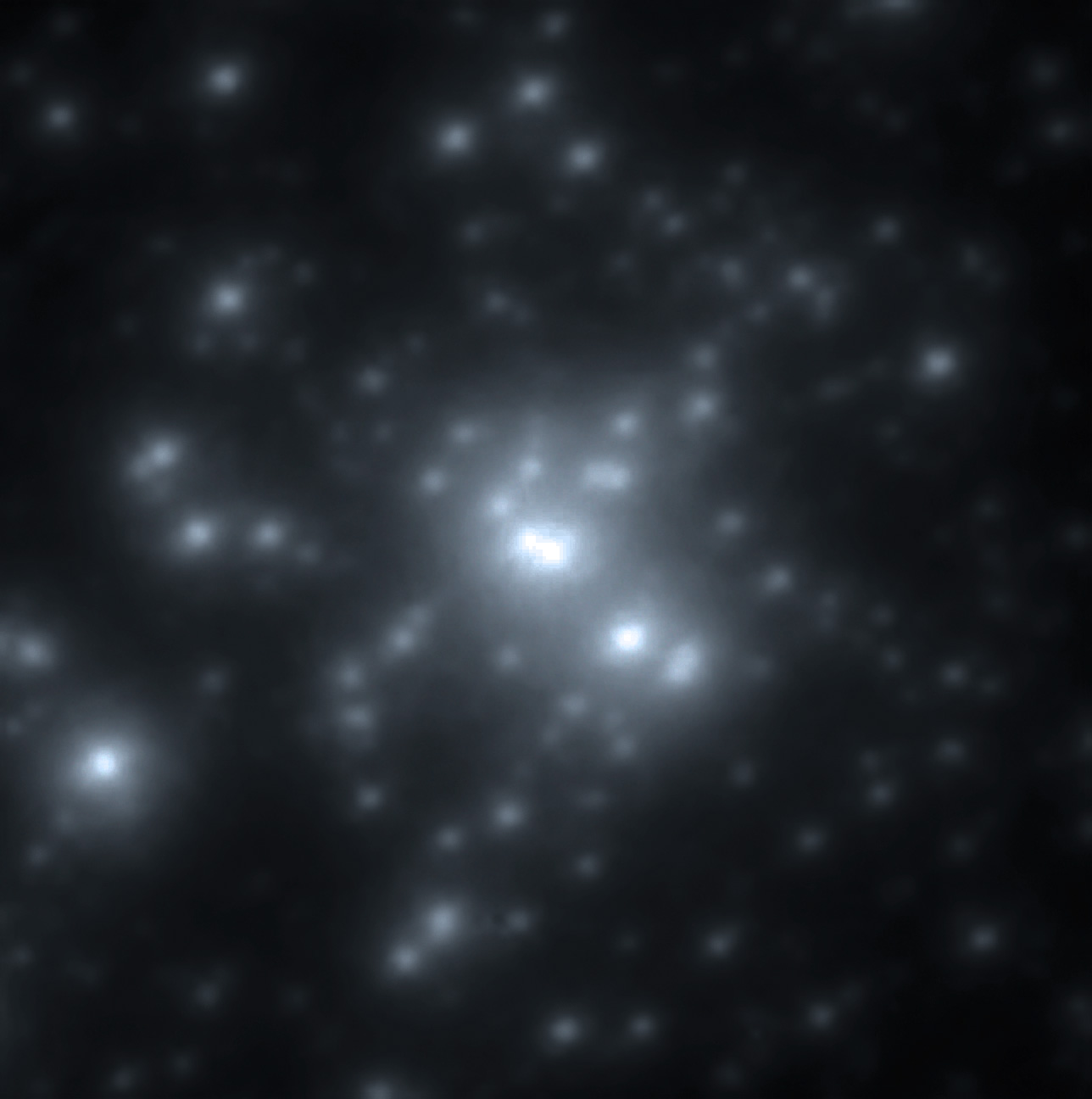
- R136a3 is the bright star at lower right of the center.

Observation data Epoch J2000 Equinox J2000.0
- Constellation: Dorado
- Right ascension: 05^{h} 38^{m} 42.33^{s}
- Declination: −69° 06′ 03.3″
- Apparent magnitude (V): 12.97

Characteristics
- Evolutionary stage: main sequence
- Spectral type: WN5h

Astrometry
Distance	163,000 ly (49,970 pc)
Absolute magnitude (M_{V})	−7.52

Details
Mass	184±40 M_{☉}
Radius	30.2±0.6 R_{☉}
Luminosity	5,012,000 L_{☉}
Temperature	50,000+2,500 −8,000 K
Age	1.48±0.14 Myr

Other designations
- RMC 136a3, BAT99 106

Database references
SIMBAD	data

R136a3 is a Wolf–Rayet star in R136, a massive star cluster located in Dorado. It is located near R136a1, the most massive and luminous star known. R136a3 is itself one of the most massive and most luminous stars known at about 184 times more massive and 5 million times more luminous than the Sun.

The formal name of the star is RMC 136a3, standing for Radcliffe observatory, Magellanic Clouds, 136a3. The RMC survey identified luminous objects in the Large Magellanic Cloud and one of the brightest was RMC 136. This is now commonly shortened to R136, which is now known to be an extremely young dense open cluster at the core of the NGC 2070 cluster in the Tarantula Nebula. R136 was eventually resolved and the brightest "star" at the centre was termed R136a. This was further resolved into multiple components, one of which is R136a3.

Although R136a3 has a Wolf-Rayet spectral type dominated by intense emission lines of helium and nitrogen, usually indicating a highly evolved star that has lost its outer layers, R136a3 is actually an extremely young star. The spectrum also includes hydrogen lines and analysis shows the star is still 40% hydrogen at the surface. The helium and nitrogen in the atmosphere of such a young star are caused by strong convection due to the massive core and intense CNO cycle fusion, enhanced further by rotational mixing. The emission lines in the spectrum indicate strong mass loss caused by the fusion products at the surface and the enormous luminosity.
