= VFTS 682 =

Wolf Rayet star in the constellation Dorado

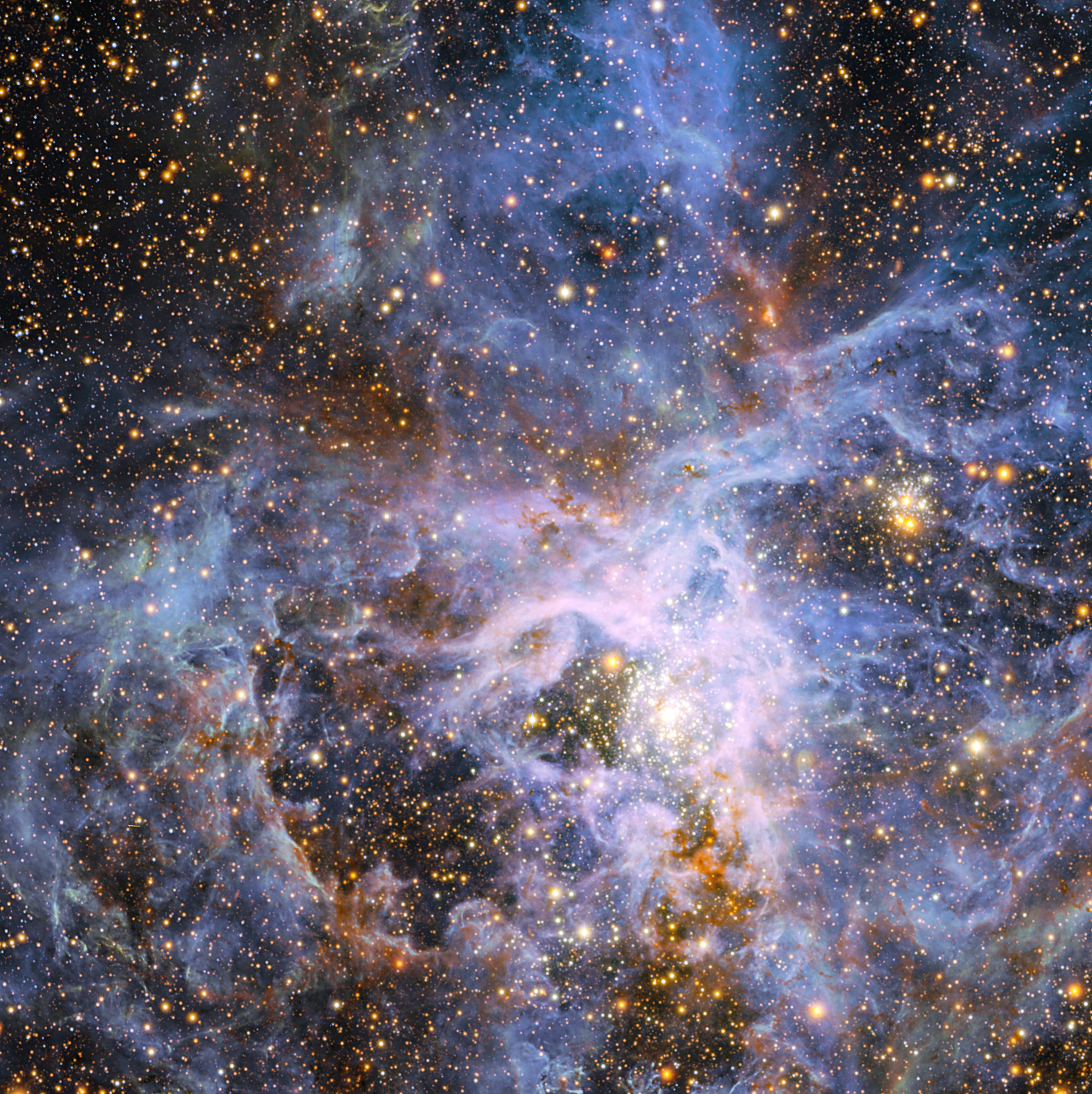
- VFTS 682 is at the very centre of this image of the Tarantula Nebula; Credit: ESO/M.-R. Cioni/VISTA Magellanic Cloud survey. Acknowledgment: Cambridge Astronomical Survey Unit

Observation data Epoch J2000 Equinox ICRS
- Constellation: Dorado
- Right ascension: 05^{h} 38^{m} 55.51^{s}
- Declination: −69° 04′ 26.72″
- Apparent magnitude (V): 16.08

Characteristics
- Spectral type: WN5h
- U−B color index: −0.349
- B−V color index: −0.58

Astrometry
Radial velocity (R_{v})	300 km/s
Distance	164,000 ly (50,000 pc)
Absolute magnitude (M_{V})	−6.83±0.12
Absolute bolometric magnitude (M_{bol})	−11.5

Details
Mass	137.8+27.5 −15.9 M_{☉}
Radius	20.2+2.5 −2.3 R_{☉}
Luminosity	3,200,000 L_{☉}
Temperature	54,450±1,960 K
Rotational velocity (v sin i)	<200 km/s
Age	1.0±0.2 Myr

Other designations
- 2MASS J05385552−6904267, IRSF J05385552−6904267, DENIS J053855.4−690425, DENIS J053855.5−690426, Dor IRS 153

Database references
SIMBAD	data

VFTS 682 is a Wolf–Rayet star in the Large Magellanic Cloud. It is located over 29 parsecs (95 ly) north-east of the massive cluster R136 in the Tarantula Nebula. It is 138 times the mass of the Sun and 3.2 million times more luminous, which makes it one of the most massive and most luminous stars known.

== Discovery ==
VFTS 682 is a prominent infrared source in the Large Magellanic Cloud and has been catalogued numerous times. In 1992 it was identified as entry 153 in a list of possible protostars. In 2009 it was again classified as a probable young stellar object on account of its exceptional infrared luminosity.

The VLT-FLAMES Tarantula survey (VFTS) examined 800 massive stars in detail and determined a spectral type of WN5h for VFTS 682. It is heavily reddened and visually several magnitudes fainter than other stars of similar luminosity and temperature in the 30 Doradus region.

== Runaway ==
VFTS 682 is in the large star-forming region of the Tarantula Nebula, but is not within a dense massive cluster. The existence of an extremely massive and extremely young star in some isolation is unexpected since these stars are expected to form only from the most massive and dense molecular clouds and hence to form in large groups such as R136 as the result of competitive accretion or stellar mergers. The formation of isolated massive star would require different models to allow monolithic disk accretion of very massive stars.

VFTS 682 is close enough to R136 that it might have formed there and been ejected. No bow shock has been detected and it has a space velocity lower than most runaways, but large enough and in the right direction that it could be from R136.

== Properties ==
The star's high mass of 138 M_{☉} compresses its core to a high temperature and causes very rapid fusion via the CNO cycle, leading to the extremely high luminosity of 3.2 million L_{☉}. The star is 22 times the radius of the Sun, but because of its high temperature it emits 3.2 million times more energy, mostly at ultraviolet wavelengths so it is only 43,000 times as bright as the Sun visually. Nearly 99% (A_{V} = 4.5) of the ultraviolet and visual radiation is then blocked by intervening interstellar material. The luminosity, intense UV radiation, and chemical makeup of the star's surface layers results in a stellar wind with a speed up to 2,600 km/s (1,600 mi/s).

== Evolution ==
Stars as massive as VFTS 682 with metallicity typical of the Large Magellanic Cloud will maintain near-homogeneous chemical structure due to strong convection and rotational mixing. This produces strong helium and nitrogen surface abundance enhancement even during core hydrogen burning. Their rotation rates will also decrease significantly due to mass loss and envelope inflation, so that gamma-ray bursts are unlikely when this type of star reaches core collapse.

Very massive stars are expected to develop directly from hydrogen-rich young stars showing an Of or WNh spectrum into classical hydrogen-poor Wolf–Rayet stars, possibly with a short period as a luminous blue variable They will continue to lose mass rapidly, passing through WN, WC, and WO stages before exploding as a Type Ic supernova and leaving behind a black hole. It is unclear whether the resulting supernova would be under-luminous, or even invisible, as the result of collapsing into the black hole, or over-luminous due to a large mass of ejected radioactive Ni_{56}.

The total lifetime would be around 2-3 million years, with the last half million years or so spent as a Wolf Rayet star burning helium at the core and a very short period burning heavier elements.
