= R136b =

Star in the constellation Dorado

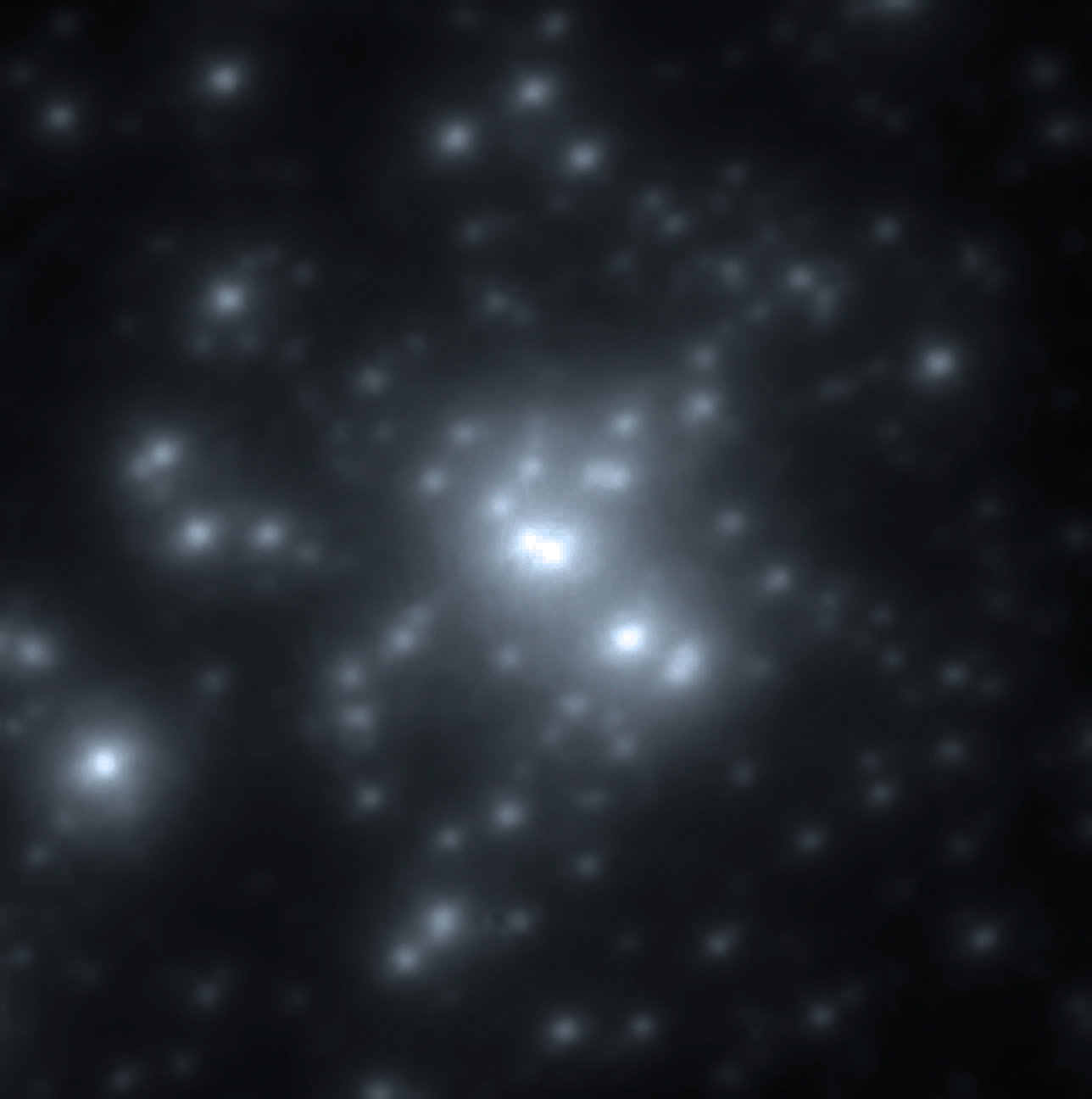
- R136b is the bright star towards the lower left. Credit: ESO

Observation data Epoch J2000.0 Equinox ICRS
- Constellation: Dorado
- Right ascension: 05^{h} 38^{m} 42.74^{s}
- Declination: −69° 06′ 03.8″
- Apparent magnitude (V): 13.24

Characteristics
- Spectral type: O4If
- B−V color index: −0.18

Astrometry
| Distance | 163,000 ly (49,970 pc) |
| Absolute magnitude (M_{V}) | −7.75 |

Details
| Mass | 117+91 −51 M_{☉} |
| Radius | 40.0 R_{☉} |
| Luminosity | 2,188,000 L_{☉} |
| Surface gravity (log g) | 3.30±0.25 cgs |
| Temperature | 35,000±2,500 K |
| Rotational velocity (v sin i) | 85 km/s |
| Age | 1.7±0.2 Myr |

Other designations
- BAT99 111, RMC 136b, [HSH95] 9, [WO84] 4, NGC 2070 MH 637, [CHH92] 26, [P93] 985.

Database references
| SIMBAD | data |

R136b is a blue supergiant star in the R136 cluster in the Large Magellanic Cloud. It is one of the most massive and most luminous stars known. It is found in the dense R136 open cluster at the centre of NGC 2070 in the Tarantula Nebula.

R136b has the spectral type of Wolf–Rayet star, with strong emission lines. Although it shows enhanced helium and nitrogen at its surface, it is still a very young star, still burning hydrogen in its core via the CNO cycle, and still effectively a main sequence object. Others studies classify the spectrum as a hot supergiant with emission lines of ionised nitrogen and helium, still considering it to be a young star at the core-hydrogen-burning stage, the unusual spectrum caused by strong convection and stellar winds.
