= R136c =

Star in the constellation Dorado

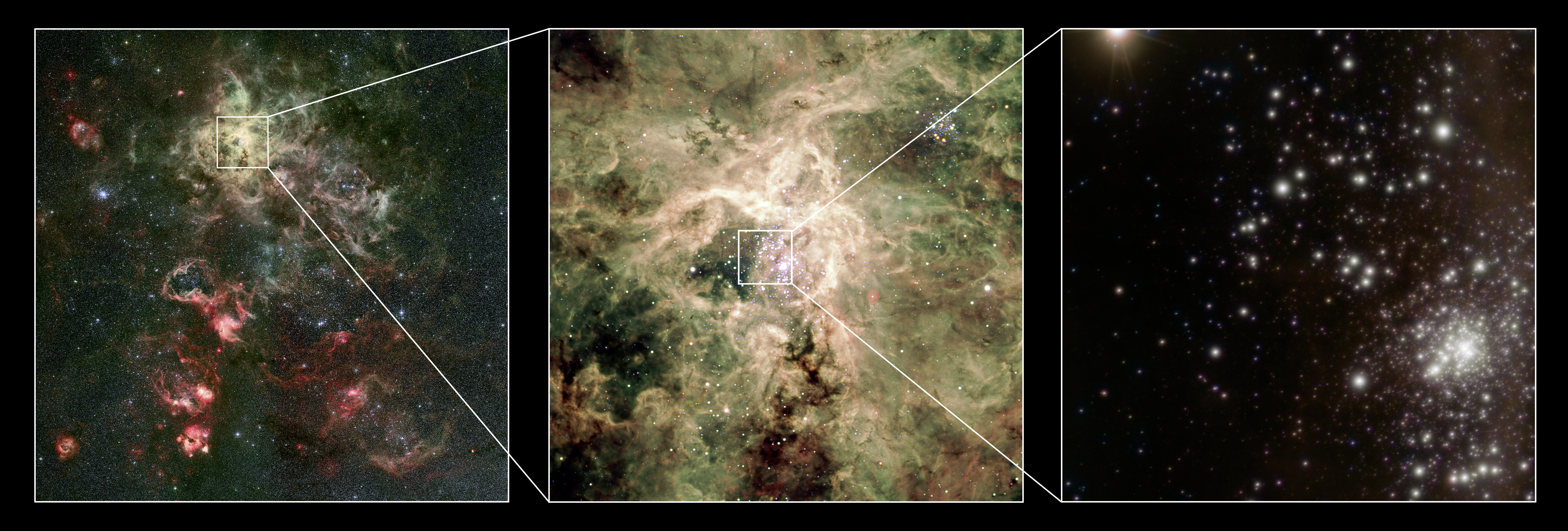
- The bright star to the left of the cluster core is R136c.

Observation data Epoch J2000.0 Equinox J2000.0
- Constellation: Dorado
- Right ascension: 5^{h} 38^{m} 42.90^{s}
- Declination: −69° 06′ 04.8″
- Apparent magnitude (V): 12.86

Characteristics
- Evolutionary stage: main sequence
- Spectral type: WN5h

Astrometry
Distance	163,000 ly (49,970 pc)
Absolute magnitude (M_{V})	−7.8

Orbit
Period (P)	17.2051 days
Eccentricity (e)	0.31±0.08
Semi-amplitude (K_{1}) (primary)	51±9 km/s

Details
Mass	142 M_{☉}
Radius	40.7 R_{☉}
Luminosity	3,800,000 L_{☉}
Temperature	42,170 K
Rotational velocity (v sin i)	<200 km/s
Age	1.8 Myr

Other designations
- BAT99 112, RMC 136c, VFTS 1025

Database references
SIMBAD	data

R136c is a likely binary star located in R136, a tight knot of stars at the centre of NGC 2070, an open cluster weighing 450,000 solar masses and containing 10,000 stars. At 142 M_{☉} and 3.8 million L_{☉}, it is one of the most massive stars known and one of the most luminous, along with being one of the hottest, at over 40,000 K. It was first resolved and named by Feitzinger in 1980, along with R136a and R136b.

== Description ==
R136c is a Wolf–Rayet star of the spectral type WN5h and with a temperature of 42,170 K, making it one of hottest stars known. It is one of the most massive stars known, with a mass of 142 M_{☉}, and it is one of the most luminous stars known, with a luminosity of 3.8 million L_{☉}. The extreme luminosity is produced by the CNO fusion process in its highly compressed hot core. Typical of all Wolf–Rayet stars, R136c has been losing mass by means of a strong stellar wind with speeds over 2,000 km/s and mass loss rates in excess of 10^{−5} solar masses per year.

It is strongly suspected to be a binary, due to the detection of hard x-ray emission typical of colliding wind binaries, but the companion is thought to make only a small contribution to the total luminosity. Absorption lines in the spectrum, tentatively assigned to the companion, indicate that it is considerably more massive than the Wolf-Rayet component. An orbit has been derived, but with low confidence and even the period is uncertain, between 5 and 47 days.

== Evolution ==
R136c is so energetic that it has already lost a substantial fraction of its initial mass, even though it is only a few million years old. It is still effectively on the main sequence, fusing hydrogen at its core via the CNO cycle, but it has convected and mixed fusion products to the surface and these create a powerful stellar wind and emission spectrum normally only seen in highly evolved stars.

Its fate depends on the amount of mass it loses before its core collapses, but is likely to result in a supernova. The most recent models for single star evolution at near-solar metallicities suggest that the most massive stars explode as highly stripped type Ic supernovae, although different outcomes are possible for binaries. Some of these supernovae are expected to produce a type of gamma-ray burst and the expected remnant is a black hole.
