= R136 =

Super star cluster in the constellation Dorado, in the Large Magellanic Cloud

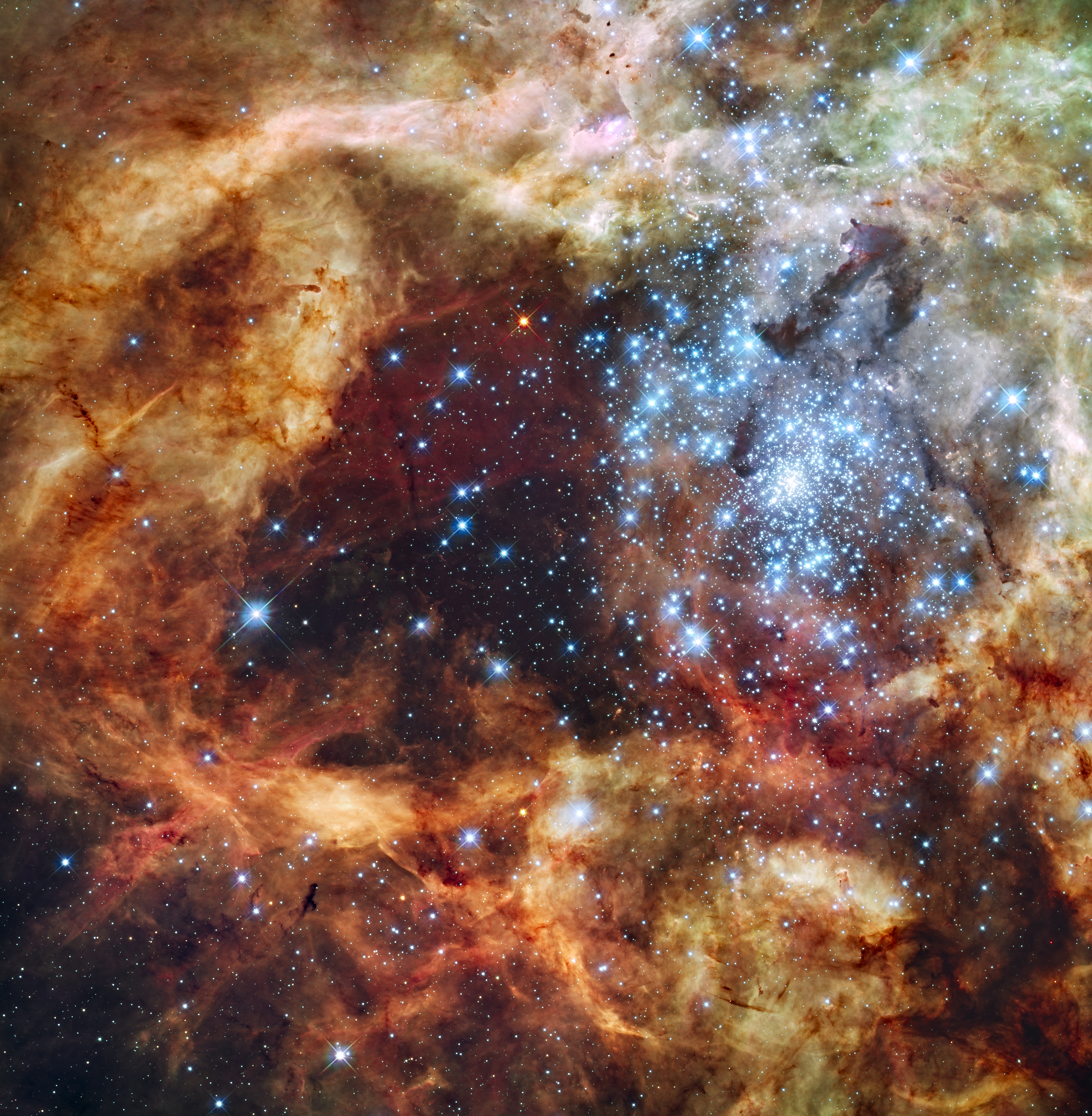
- In ultraviolet, visible, and red light by Hubble Space Telescope Wide Field Camera 3 Credit: NASA, ESA

Observation data (J2000.0 epoch)
- Right ascension: 05^{h} 38^{m} 42.396^{s}
- Declination: −69° 06′ 03.36″
- Distance: 157 kly (48.5 kpc)
- Apparent magnitude (V): 9.50

Physical characteristics
- Mass: 90,000 M_{☉}
- Estimated age: 1.5+0.3 −0.7 million years
- Other designations: UCAC2 1803442, SAO 249329, HD 38268, TYC 9163-1014-1, CD-69 324, GC 7114

Associations
- Constellation: Dorado

R136 (formerly known as RMC 136 from the Radcliffe Observatory Magellanic Clouds catalogue) is the central concentration of stars in the NGC 2070 star cluster, which lies at the centre of the Tarantula Nebula in the Large Magellanic Cloud. When originally named it was an unresolved stellar object (catalogued as HD 38268 and Wolf–Rayet star Brey 82) but is now known to include 72 class O and Wolf–Rayet stars within 5 parsecs (20 arc seconds) of the centre of the cluster. The extreme number and concentration of young massive stars in this part of the LMC qualifies it as a starburst region.

== Properties ==
R136 produces most of the energy that makes the Tarantula Nebula visible. The estimated mass of the cluster is 450,000 solar masses, suggesting it may become a globular cluster in the future. R136 has around 200 times the stellar density of a typical OB association such as Cygnus OB2. The central R136 concentration of the cluster is about 2 parsecs across, although the whole NGC 2070 cluster is much larger.

R136 is thought to be less than 2 million years old. None of the member stars are significantly evolved, and none are thought to have exploded as supernova. Because of this, the cluster contains no red supergiants, blue hypergiants, or luminous blue variables. The brightest stars are WNh, O supergiants, and OIf/WN slash stars, all extremely massive fully convective stars. A small number of B-type main sequence stars have been detected in the outskirts of the cluster, but less massive and less luminous stars cannot be resolved from the dense cluster core at the large distance of the LMC.

=== R136a ===
R136a is the bright knot at the centre of R136. It consists of eight extremely massive stars, three of them Wolf–Rayet stars and the rest early O-class stars.

== Components ==
The cluster contains many of the most massive and luminous stars known, including R136a1. Within the central 5 parsecs there are 32 of the hottest type O stars (O2.0–3.5), 40 other O stars, and 12 Wolf–Rayet stars, mostly of the extremely luminous WNh type. Within 150 parsecs there are a further 325 O stars and 19 Wolf–Rayet stars. Several runaway stars have been associated with R136, including VFTS 682. R136 was first resolved into three components R136a, R136b, and R136c. R136a was resolved using speckle interferometry and eventually space-based observations into as many as 24 components, dominated by R136a1, R136a2, and R136a3, all three being extremely massive WNh stars several million times more luminous than the sun.

Basic data for the original RMC 136 a, b, and c stars
Name	Right ascension	Declination	V (F555W)	Spectral type	M_{V} (F555W)	Temperature (K)	Luminosity (L_{☉})	Mass (M_{☉})
R136a1	05^{h} 38^{m} 42.396^{s}	−69° 06′ 02.87″	12.28	WN5h	−8.18	46,000	7,244,000	291
R136a2	05^{h} 38^{m} 42.415^{s}	−69° 06′ 02.81″	12.80	WN5h	−7.80	47,000	5,129,000	195
R136a3	05^{h} 38^{m} 42.338^{s}	−69° 06′ 03.21″	12.97	WN5h	−7.52	50,000	5,012,000	184
R136a4	05^{h} 38^{m} 42.346^{s}	−69° 06′ 02.55″	13.96	O3 V((f*))(n)	−6.68	50,000	1,905,000	108
R136a5	05^{h} 38^{m} 42.436^{s}	−69° 06′ 02.67″	13.71	O2I(n)f^{*}	−6.86	48,000	2,089,000	116
R136a6	05^{h} 38^{m} 42.294^{s}	−69° 06′ 03.29″	13.35	O2I(n)f^{*}p	−6.46	52,000	1,738,000	105
R136a7	05^{h} 38^{m} 42.414^{s}	−69° 06′ 02.52″	13.97	O3III(f^{*})	−6.59	54,000	2,291,000	127
R136a8	05^{h} 38^{m} 42.362^{s}	−69° 06′ 02.54″	14.42	O2–3V	−6.05	49,500	1,479,000	96
R136b	05^{h} 38^{m} 42.745^{s}	−69° 06′ 03.70″	13.24	O4If	−7.70	35,500	2,239,000	92
R136c	05^{h} 38^{m} 42.916^{s}	−69° 06′ 04.94″	12.86	WN5h	−7.9	42,170	3,802,000	142

== Gallery ==
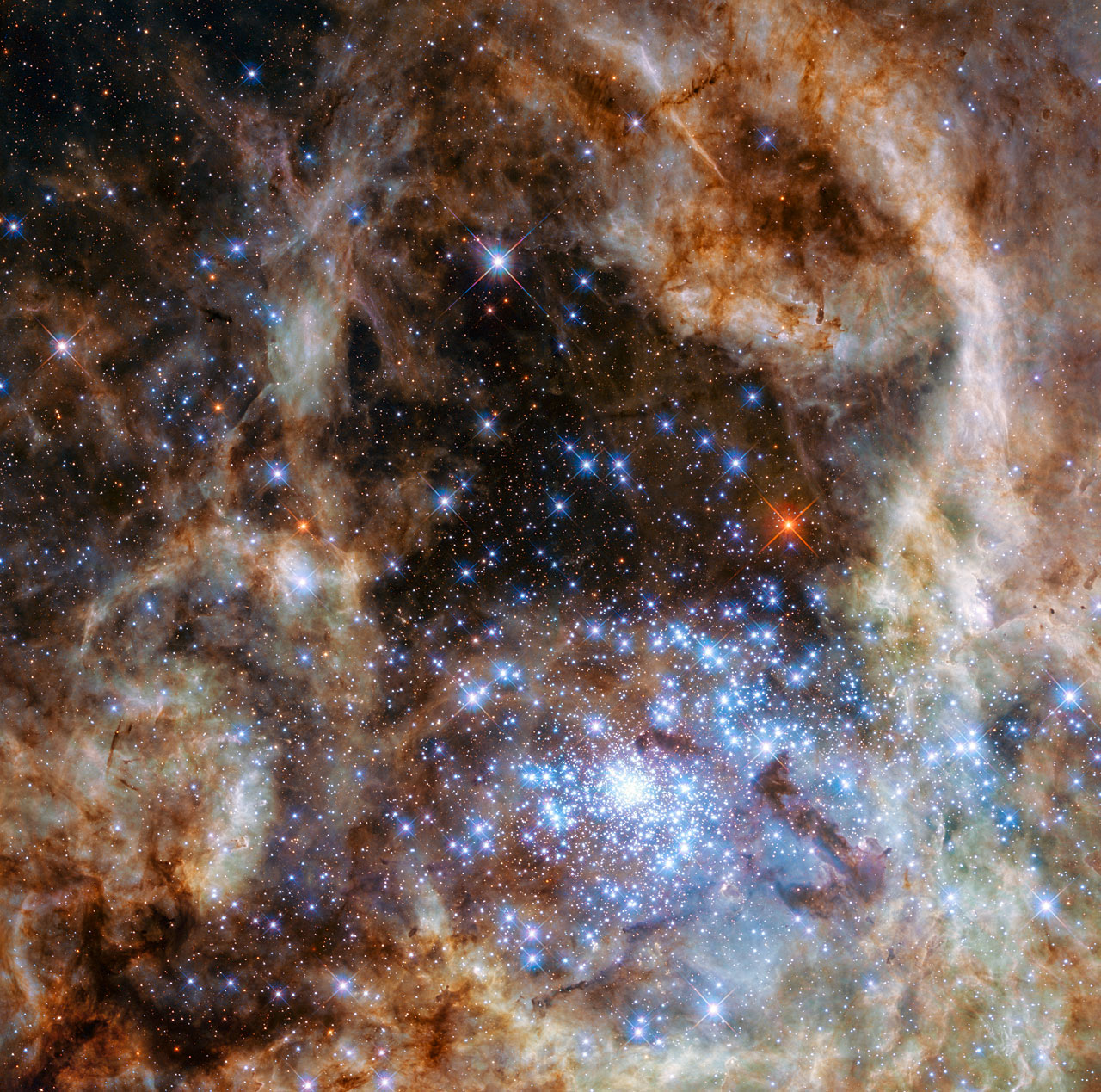
R136 observed with Hubble's WFC3

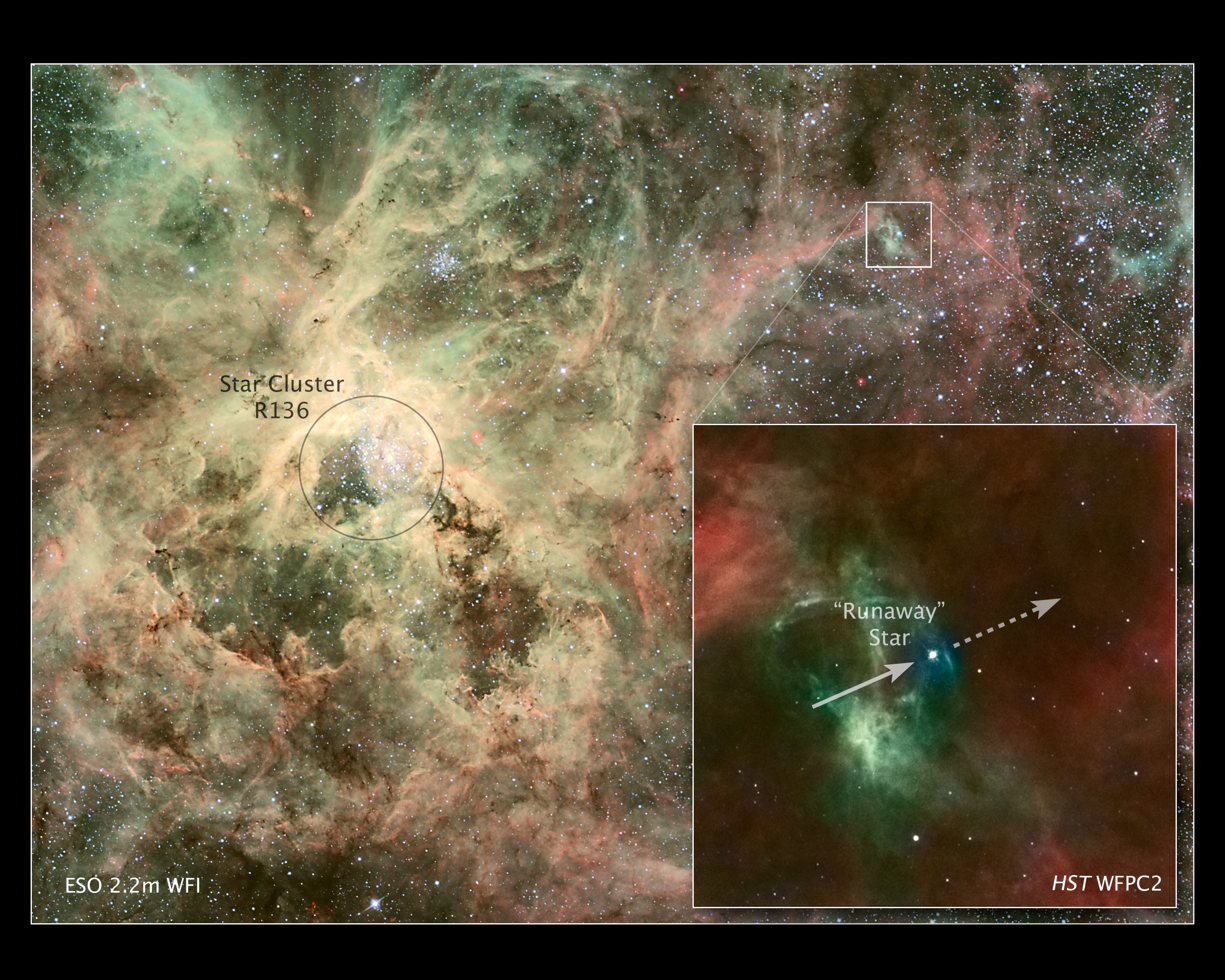
Runaway star speeding from 30 Doradus in an image taken by the Hubble Space Telescope

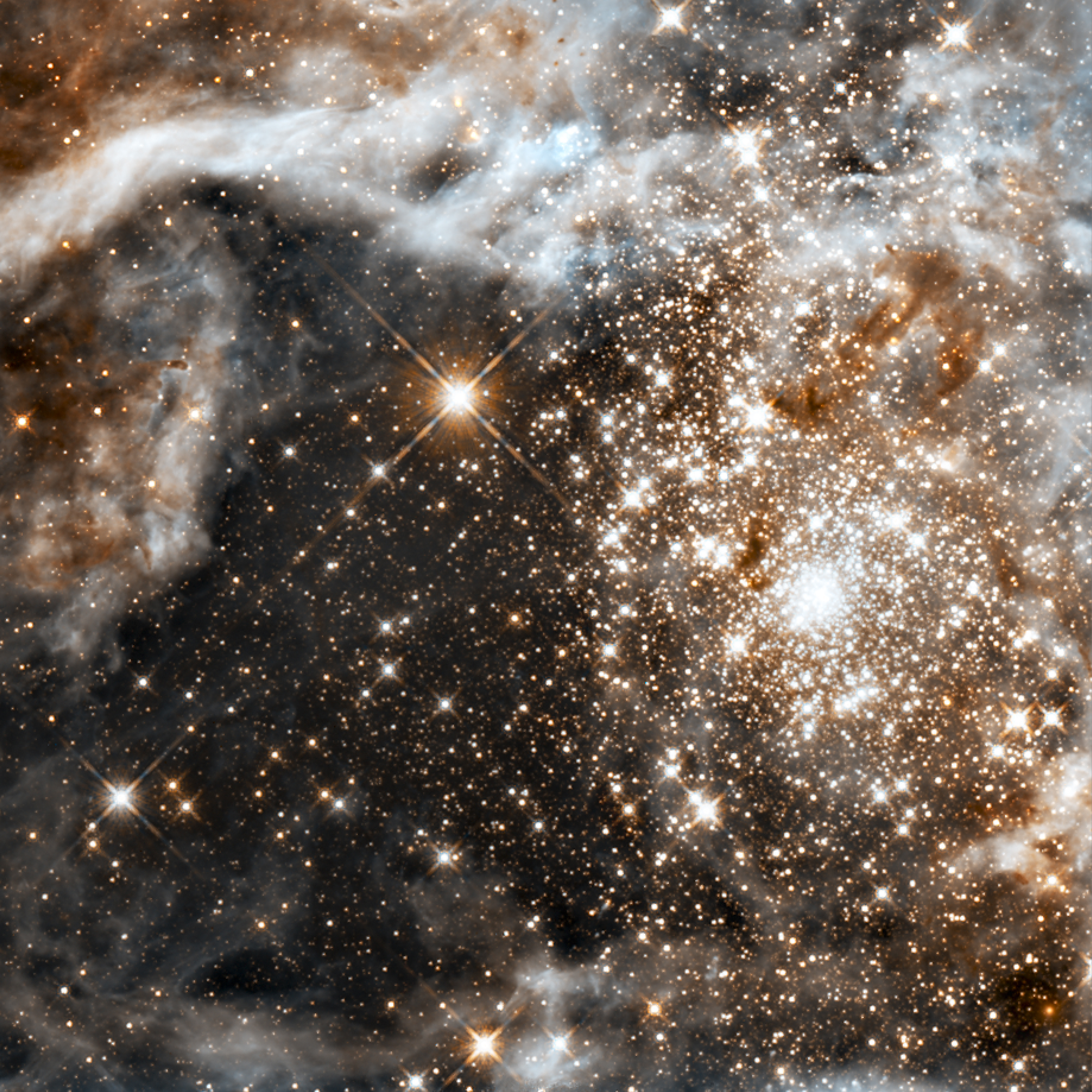
R136 in infrared (Hubble Space Telescope)

== See also ==
- Hodge 301, an older massive star cluster in Tarantula Nebula
- NGC 2060, a smaller open cluster near R136
- LMC N79, containing another super star cluster in the Large Magellanic Cloud
- List of most massive stars
