= Stellar mass =

Mass of a star in astronomy

Stellar mass is a phrase that is used by astronomers to describe the mass of a star. It is usually enumerated in terms of the Sun's mass as a proportion of a solar mass (M_{☉}). Hence, the bright star Sirius has around 2.02 M_{☉}. A star's mass will vary over its lifetime as mass is lost with the stellar wind or ejected via pulsational behavior, or if additional mass is accreted, such as from a companion star.

== Properties ==
Stars are sometimes grouped by mass based upon their evolutionary behavior as they approach the end of their nuclear fusion lifetimes.

Very-low-mass stars with masses below 0.5 M_{☉} do not enter the asymptotic giant branch (AGB) but evolve directly into white dwarfs. (At least in theory; the lifetimes of such stars are long enough—longer than the age of the universe to date—that none has yet had time to evolve to this point and be observed.)

Low-mass stars with a mass below about 1.8–2.2 M_{☉} (depending on composition) do enter the AGB, where they develop a degenerate helium core.

Intermediate-mass stars undergo helium fusion and develop a degenerate carbon–oxygen core.

Massive stars have a minimum mass of 5–10 M_{☉}. These stars undergo carbon fusion, with their lives ending in a core-collapse supernova explosion. Black holes created as a result of a stellar collapse are termed stellar-mass black holes.

The combination of the radius and the mass of a star determines the surface gravity. Giant stars have a much lower surface gravity than main sequence stars, while the opposite is the case for degenerate, compact stars such as white dwarfs. The surface gravity can influence the appearance of a star's spectrum, with higher gravity causing a broadening of the absorption lines.

== Range ==
One of the most massive stars known is Eta Carinae, with 100–200 M_{☉}; its lifespan is very short—only several million years at most. A study of the Arches Cluster suggests that 150 M_{☉} is the upper limit for stars in the current era of the universe. The reason for this limit is not precisely known, but it is partially due to the Eddington luminosity which defines the maximum amount of luminosity that can pass through the atmosphere of a star without ejecting the gases into space. However, a star named R136a1 in the RMC 136a star cluster has been measured at 291 M_{☉}, putting this limit into question. A study has determined that stars larger than 150 M_{☉} in R136 were created through the collision and merger of massive stars in close binary systems, providing a way to sidestep the 150 M_{☉} limit.

The first stars to form after the Big Bang may have been larger, up to 300 M_{☉} or more, due to the complete absence of elements heavier than lithium in their composition. This generation of supermassive, population III stars is long extinct, however, and currently only theoretical.

With a mass only 93 times that of Jupiter (M_{J}), or .09 M_{☉}, AB Doradus C, a companion to AB Doradus A, is the smallest known star undergoing nuclear fusion in its core. For stars with similar metallicity to the Sun, the theoretical minimum mass the star can have, and still undergo fusion at the core, is estimated to be about 75 M_{J}. When the metallicity is very low, however, a recent study of the faintest stars found that the minimum star size seems to be about 8.3% of the solar mass, or about 87 M_{J}. Smaller bodies are called brown dwarfs, which occupy a poorly defined grey area between stars and gas giants.

== Change ==
The Sun is losing mass from the emission of electromagnetic energy and by the ejection of matter with the solar wind. It is expelling about (2–3)×10^{−14} M_{☉} per year. The mass loss rate will increase when the Sun enters the red giant stage, climbing to (7–9)×10^{−14} M_{☉} y^{−1} when it reaches the tip of the red-giant branch. This will rise to 10^{−6} M_{☉} y^{−1} on the asymptotic giant branch, before peaking at a rate of 10^{−5} to 10^{−4} M_{☉} y^{−1} as the Sun generates a planetary nebula. By the time the Sun becomes a degenerate white dwarf, it will have lost 46% of its starting mass.
