= Danganronpa S: Ultimate Summer Camp =

2021 video game

- Promotional artwork
- Developer: Spike Chunsoft
- Publisher: Spike Chunsoft (Note: Numskull Games published the game's physical release in Europe.)
- Director: Shun Sasaki
- Designers: Manabu Sakai; Hung-Chun Lin; Ju-Ching Yu
- Programmer: Cheng-Yen Hsieh
- Artists: Akira Ohyama; Rui Komatsuzaki
- Composer: Masafumi Takada
- Series: Danganronpa
- Platforms: Nintendo Switch; Android; iOS; PlayStation 4; Windows
- Release: Switch: JP: November 4, 2021; WW: December 3, 2021; Android, iOS, PS4, Win: WW: July 21, 2022
- Genres: Role-playing, Digital tabletop
- Mode: Single-player

Danganronpa S: Ultimate Summer Camp (Note: Happī Danganronpa S Chō kōkō-kyū no Nangoku Saikoro Gasshuku (Japanese: ハッピーダンガンロンパS 超高校級の南国サイコロ合宿; lit. "Happy Bullet Refutation S: Super High School Level Tropical Dice Camp")) is a role-playing video game with board game elements, developed and published by Spike Chunsoft for the Nintendo Switch in late 2021, with Android, iOS, PlayStation 4, and Windows versions released in 2022. The game, a spin-off installment in the Danganronpa visual novel series, is an expanded version of two side-modes from Danganronpa V3: Killing Harmony (2017), and was released digitally as a standalone game and physically through the game compilation Danganronpa Decadence, as a part of celebrations for the 10th anniversary of the Danganronpa series.

The game is set on the tropical resort known as Jabberwock Island, and follows a group of 62 students and related persons as they search for hope over the course of a 50-day-long summer test program. The game, directed by Shun Sasaki, was released in November 2021 in Japan and a month later in the west. Upon launch, Ultimate Summer Camp was met with mixed reception from critics, who mainly criticized the gameplay loop and inclusion of microtransactions, while appreciating how the game could potentially be enjoyed by Danganronpa fans for its character interactions and fan service.

== Gameplay ==

In the game, players first level-up characters in the Development mode (top) and then use them to fight enemies in the Battle mode (bottom).

Danganronpa S: Ultimate Summer Camp is an expanded version of the Ultimate Talent Development Plan and Despair Dungeon: Monokuma's Test role-playing post-game side modes from Danganronpa V3: Killing Harmony. In Ultimate Summer Camp's Development mode, players level-up different Danganronpa characters in a square-divided board game-like setting, which is traversed over the course of 50 turns, with each turn representing an in-game day. The board has a total of six different islands, which are unlocked through defeating the prior island's boss, with later islands allowing players to more easily develop their character. The squares, or tiles, are divided into different types, which'll have unique results, including giving players statistic increases or items, among other effects. To more easily traverse the board, players can take the use of cards, which are obtained through "Card Squares" and allow players to move a certain amount of squares. Cards can also have different effects, such as giving the playing character a temporary statistic increase.

Throughout the development mode, players encounter enemies, defeating which will award them with experience points, as well as "Jabbercoins", the game's currency, which can be used at shops to buy equipment or other items. The combat system in Ultimate Summer Camp is similar to that of other turn-based role-playing games: players can perform both normal and special/elemental attacks, with special attacks taking up skill points, limiting the number of times they can be used. Special attacks are unlocked through the use of "Talent Fragments", which can be obtained via stepping on certain squares or by viewing certain scenes. Each character also has an "Awaken" bar, which effects the power of attacks if used. If a battle is lost, players are sent back to the beginning of the board.

In the game's dungeon crawler-styled Battle mode, players form teams of up to four using their developed characters to fight floors of enemies in a 200-story tall "Tower of Despair". Each 10th floor in the mode features a boss, defeating which will give players access to the next 10 floors. Clearing certain floors in the Battle mode will give players perks in the Development mode, allowing for faster progression.

The game features a total of 62 different playable characters, all with four different rarity types, in addition to 9 "Hype Cards" each, which will give enhancements to the respective character if unlocked. Characters are unlocked through three different kinds of luck-based gashapon vending machines, using special coins that can be acquired in the Battle mode or by completing certain milestones and achievements. Players can also unlock characters via microtransactions in the Nintendo Switch eShop.

== Plot ==
The game begins with Komaru Naegi, who has been invited to a test program hosted by the prestigious Hope's Peak Academy high school for soon-to-be graduates, as well as preschoolers of the Hope's Peak Elementary, some students from the school's reserve course, and certain family members of the students, the last of which applying to Komaru. After all participants introduce each other inside the academy, the hosts of the program are revealed to be a quintet of anthropomorphic bear cubs and the children of series mascot Monokuma, named the Monokubs. The Monokubs reveal that the test program is intended to cultivate the talents of the participants, and that it will take place in a virtual recreation of the popular resort, Jabberwock Island.

After everyone has been successfully transported to the virtual Jabberwock Island, the Monokubs explains that if the students want to leave the island, they must first unlock everyone's "Hope Fragments", acquired through a participant finding their true hope and potential. Furthermore, the Monokubs demonstrate how they have full control over the world with magical wands by summoning a beach house. This leads to the mischievous and cynical Monokuma, who was also invited to the program, to steal one of the wands and summon a horde of enemies. Together, the participants manage to defeat some of the monsters, finding out in the process that their bodies have been powered-up for the virtual world. Although the Monokubs manage to get the wand back from Monokuma, the island is still overrun by monsters, which the participants are tasked with defeating over the course of the summer. In the following months, as the characters go about their daily life, they learn that the Monokubs, too, have Hope Fragments, meaning that the characters have to assist them in finding hope as well.

Once all Hope Fragments have been acquired, the Monokubs hold a graduation ceremony, though it is interrupted by the students of Hope's Peak Elementary, who, together with Monokid of the Monokubs, betray the rest of the group and attempt to prolong the training camp. One of the preschoolers, Monaca Towa, uses a special megaphone to destroy the Monokubs, hoping to get their wands. Monokuma ends up getting the wands instead, and using them, he resets the entire simulation, destroying all the Hope Fragments in the process, and attempts to force the participants into a mutual killing game after erasing select memories. One participant, Makoto Naegi, somehow maintains his memory, and begins to formulate a plan to stop Monokuma using Monaca's megaphone. Makoto ends up facing off against Monokuma at the central island, although Makoto loses, and has his memory erased. Makoto is then saved by the other participants, who were able to regain their memories after hearing Monokuma's conversation with Makoto. Together, they manage to defeat Monokuma and reacquire their Hope Fragments. With this, the participants are able to successfully return to the real world, ending the program, as well as their time at Hope's Peak.

== Development and release ==
Danganronpa S: Ultimate Summer Camp was developed by the Japanese development company Spike Chunsoft, as a way to celebrate the Danganronpa series' 10th anniversary. The game was directed by Shun Sasaki, who had previously also served as the director for Danganronpa V3, with music done by series composer Masafumi Takada and writing by the same people who made the "Free Time" interactions in V3. The game's art was directed by Akira Ohyama, although Rui Komatsuzaki, the Danganronpa character designer, illustrated the game's promotional art. The art of the game's Hype Cards was done in collaboration with several guest artists. For the game, all included characters had to be given new sprites with swimsuits, a process which Sasaki described as lengthy and, in some cases, difficult.

The plan to port the Danganronpa series to the Nintendo Switch was first conceptualized around the same time as the mobile releases for Danganronpa: Trigger Happy Havoc and 2: Goodbye Despair in 2020. According to Sasaki, he had wanted to create an all-star styled Danganronpa game, and felt that expanding upon the extra modes from Danganronpa V3 would fit that theme the best. The game was decided to take place at the fictitious tropical resort Jabberwock Island, the same setting as the second game, as Ultimate Summer Camp aims to make players enjoy the world of Danganronpa, which Sasaki felt was better accomplished by a tropical island, because of it being a more familiar location to players, as compared to other Danganronpa settings. Early in development, the game featured a fully 2D art style, although this was later changed to instead use pre-rendered 3D assets, which allowed pixel art to be more easily blended with the boards.

During development, Spike Chunsoft spent much time attempting to balance the gameplay between the game's different modes. One part of the balancing was making it so that different characters and their rarities did not affect core gameplay too much, since what characters players unlock heavily relies on luck. According to Sasaki, the balancing was not finished until much later in development, as it was improved bit by bit as new features were implemented. The game's microtransactions were supposedly added as a means to prevent frustration from players who were unable to get their preferred characters.

The game was first announced by Spike Chunsoft in a Nintendo Direct presentation in July 2021, along with the compilation game Danganronpa Decadence, consisting of the Danganronpa trilogy, as well as Ultimate Summer Camp. Both games later released on November 4, 2021, in Japan and Taiwan, with a North American and European release following on December 3. A physical collector's edition of Decadence was also released, and was published by Spike Chunsoft in Japan and North America, and by Numskull Games in Europe. Android, iOS, PlayStation 4, and Windows versions were released on July 21, 2022.

== Reception ==
Reception

Aggregate score
Aggregator	Score
Metacritic	54/100

Review scores
Publication	Score
Hardcore Gamer	3/5
IGN	6/10
Nintendo Life	5/10
Nintendo World Report	6/10
RPGFan	65/100

Danganronpa S: Ultimate Summer Camp was met with mixed reviews from critics, with review aggregation site Metacritic calculating a normalized rating of 54/100, based upon 9 reviews.

The game's core gameplay and loop has been criticized by reviewers for being repetitive, as well as how grinding quickly becomes necessary for players to progress. Stuart Gipp of Nintendo Life described the game as a "total grindfest", commenting that the gameplay of the Development mode hardly changes with new playthroughs, ultimately concluding that the game repeats itself too much. Alana Hagues, writing for RPGFan, criticized the game for being luck-based, using getting the correct cards or landing on the more beneficial squares as examples. In a review for Anime News Network, Lauren Orsini expressed how she had hoped for more unique content within the game, but still generally enjoyed how the game could be played for a long time before completion.

Critics have been more positive to the interactions between characters, and have written that the game could be more enjoyable for Danganronpa fans, as compared to newcomers of the series. Biagio Etna, reviewing the game for IGN Italy, wrote that he found it "undoubtedly pleasant" to see characters from the different entries interact, but criticized the presence of characters from the spin-off game Another Episode: Ultra Despair Girls, as the game was not included in the Danganronpa Decadence collection. Rolling Uchizawa at Famitsu expressed that, due to the game's premise relying on players knowing of the characters, it could potentially be hard to enjoy for non-fans of the series. In an impressions article for Destructoid, Eric van Allen referred to the game as being focused on fan service, and wrote that, while some of it is "really good", it ended up falling victim to the gameplay, which he felt was lacking.

The game's use of microtransactions has been a key point of disliking in reviews. Gipp condemned the existence of in-game purchases, and voiced further disapproval on the matter due to the game not being free-to-play. Hagues wrote that "something about [the] system rubbed [her] the wrong way", but still felt that directly purchasing characters was more favorable than buying coins for use in the vending machines. Electronic Gaming Monthly's Mollie Patterson, in a review of Danganronpa Decadence, took a more neutral stance towards the microtransactions, writing that she never felt the need to take use of them.
