= Monokuma =

Identity in the Danganronpa franchise

- Danganronpa character
- Monokuma in Danganronpa V3: Killing Harmony (2017)
- First game: Danganronpa: Trigger Happy Havoc (2010)
- Created by: Kazutaka Kodaka
- Designed by: Rui Komatsuzaki
- Voiced by: English: Brian Beacock (video games); Greg Ayres (anime); Japanese: Nobuyo Ōyama; Tarako (The End of Hope's Peak High School, Killing Harmony); Wasabi Mizuta (Danganronpa 2×2)

In-universe information
- Controllers: Junko Enoshima; Chisa Yukizome; Kazuo Tengan; Ryota Mitarai; Tsumugi Shirogane

Monokuma (Japanese: モノクマ) is a fictional identity adopted by several characters in the Danganronpa series, serving as the mascot and main antagonist of the series. Monokuma first appears in Danganronpa: Trigger Happy Havoc as a disguise used by Junko Enoshima during her killing game in the fictional school of Hope's Peak Academy. Monokuma was created by scenario writer Kazutaka Kodaka and designed by Rui Komatsuzaki. The identity is used primarily as a disguise for the masterminds of each game, concealing their identities while overseeing and organizing killing games, and, as such, has been voiced by several actors. The character has often appeared in popular culture since its inception, spawning a series of action figures and merchandise. Nobuyo Ōyama, Tarako, and Wasabi Mizuta voice Monokuma in Japanese, while Brian Beacock provides his voice for the English versions of the games and Greg Ayres provides his voice for the English dub of Danganronpa: The Animation.

In the Danganronpa universe, the robotic bear is not unique and is readily obtainable, allowing others to assume its identity. Monokuma regularly interacts with killing game participants and other targets to taunt or threaten them while using a voice changer that hides its true identity, in addition to executing each culprit if they kill another student. In Danganronpa 2: Goodbye Despair, Monokuma transforms Jabberwock Island Operator Usami into a sister figure, which he dubs Monomi, while in the spin-off Danganronpa Another Episode: Ultra Despair Girls, two different characters that are similar to Monokuma, the all-white Shirokuma and all-black Kurokuma, appear, in addition to an army of Monokuma robots. In the third main series game, Danganronpa V3: Killing Harmony, Monokuma is provided "children" with the Monokubs, consisting of: Monotaro, Monodam, Monokid, Monophanie, Monosuke, and the Nanokumas, as well as a mother figure dubbed Motherkuma, responsible for manufacturing Monokuma's robot bodies.

Critical response to Monokuma has been generally favourable, and he is often listed among the best characters in the franchise.

== Concept and creation ==
Early unused artwork of Monokuma by Rui Komatsuzaki

The Monokuma robot is one controlled by the main antagonists of the Danganronpa franchise, consisting of a teddy bear with a black left-hand side, a white right-hand-side, one black right-eye, one red-left eye containing the logo for Hope's Peak Academy, a half-smile expression, short ears and an extruding belly button microphone, with a built-in explosive device in the scenario that a student decides to fight the Monokuma robot. His design is meant to be the basis of black-and-white morality. His activation in the first game's finale was meant to elaborate on the fact that Junko was still controlling him in the form of a virus.

The character's name originates from a combination of the romanization of monochrome (モノクローム, monokurōmu), referencing his black-and-white color scheme, and クマ (kuma), the Japanese word for a bear. The character's black-and-white color scheme is in reference to the concepts of innocence (白, white) and guilt (黒, black) in Japanese, embodying the character's typical depiction as a judge and executioner. The original design of the Monokuma character as originally intended for Distrust (an early version of Danganronpa: Trigger Happy Havoc]) as character designer Rui Komatsuzaki drew them depicted them as resembling an anatomical model commonly used in education, with their white and black sides being originally depicted as a nude human, fully-skinned on one side of their body, while having their muscles and organs exposed on the other side with a red color scheme. In redeveloping the game for the "psychopop" genre, Kodaka told Komatsuzaki to create "a bear [who] was half-white and half-dark with the dark half resembling Venom"; Komatsuzaki then illustrated the final character design concept art within 15 minutes, which Kodaka then believed to be suitable for the game. Kodaka also cites Winnie the Pooh as an influence for the character.

Referring to the creation of Monokuma by Kazutaka Kodaka and the character's subsequent position as a mascot of Spike Chunsoft appearing in multiple other video game series produced by the company, Danganronpa series producer Yoshinori Terasawa stated:

"[Monokuma] was created with an image of contradictions in mind, like good and evil, hope and despair. These contradicting elements create a sort of highlighting effect. Although it ended up being much darker than expected (laughs). But I think that's just an expression of Mr. Kodaka's nature, as well. It's nice to see Monokuma show up in different games, because I get to see him from a user's perspective. Even within those different game worlds, I think he still exerts his presence. Society these days seems to have a general feeling of hopelessness. So I thought it would be good to emphasize the importance of having hope and just moving forward."

For the English dub of the game, Spike Chunsoft specifically requested NIS America to keep Monokuma's name the same. The team described the character as their favorite to localize, working together to keep the character looking funny and at the same time threatening like in the Japanese version, which led to difficulties in finding a suitable voice actor to embody their "hyperactive psychopath[ic] nature" due to the "beloved[ness]" of the original voice actress, characterizing him as "bossy, condescending, smarmy, goofy, quick to anger, quick to forgive, quick to anger again, devious, and totally lovable".

== Appearances ==
=== Video games and anime ===
Monokuma first appears in the opening scene of Danganronpa: Trigger Happy Havoc (2010). The character, sitting in front of a man tied to a chair, pushes a button that launches the man through the building they are in, up into the sky and then to space, reducing him to a skeleton upon his crash landing. Viewing the man's remains, Monokuma begins chuckling.

Sometime later, Monokuma greets 15 "Ultimate" students of Hope's Peak Academy, introducing himself as the school's headmaster and informing them that they will be living within the grounds of the academy for the remainder of their natural lives lest one of them become "the blackened" and murder another. After providing a motive which leads to a murder then taking place, Monokuma reveals that if the blackened wishes to leave, they must first pass through a class trial with their fellow students – if caught, they will be executed, if not, their classmates will be executed. After the first blackened is caught and executed by Monokuma, Monokuma provides a series of additional motives over the following weeks, leading to further murders, class trials, and executions. Monokuma is additionally revealed to have a spy planted amongst the 15 students partaking in the game, in addition to hiding the existence of a 16th student within the academy. During the fifth chapter, Monokuma is revealed to be a series of robots controlled by a mastermind from a secret room on the fourth floor of the academy. In the sixth chapter, Junko Enoshima is revealed by Makoto Naegi as the mastermind behind Monokuma in the game, using her twin sister Mukuro Ikusaba as a stand-in. Monokuma's face serves as the symbol to the group known as ultimate despair.

After the students elect to leave the academy, Junko executes herself alongside Monokuma; however, in a post-credits scene, a sentient Monokuma mysteriously reactivates within the class trial grounds and swears that it will continue its quest to spread despair as "your headmaster."

Monokuma's second appearance was in Danganronpa 2: Goodbye Despair (2012), where it is again used as a disguise by the mastermind. After commandeering an apparent school trip of 16 Hope's Peak Academy students to Jabberwock Island and turning it into a killing game, Monokuma reveals to the students that their memories had been wiped by the Future Foundation, and that their apparent rabbit teacher, Usami, had been turned into a 'sister' figure he dubs Monomi. After all but five students are killed, Monokuma invites the remaining students into a glitching Hope's Peak Academy trial grounds for a graduation ceremony, where they are revealed to be computer avatar copies of the Remnants of Despair, followers of Junko Enoshima and Ultimate Despair who had been captured by Makoto Naegi and the other survivors of the first killing game in the hope of replacing their memories with those of their younger selves to redeem them and save them from the despair brainwashing done by Junko Enoshima, instead of executing them per the Future Foundation's orders and turning them into martyrs. Monokuma himself is revealed to contain an A.I. copy of Junko's consciousness, which she had copied using Alter Ego in the climax of the previous game, inserted into the game by Ultimate Despair leader and true mastermind Izuru Kamukura under the guise of Hajime Hinata. After shedding the form of Monokuma, the new Alter Ego Junko reveals their plan to supposedly be to insert copies of herself into the deceased Remnants' bodies on their escape from the Neo World Program in which they have been imprisoned; however, Izuru's Hajime personality instead convinces the remaining Remnants to remain in the program, leading to Junko's deletion by a new manifestation of Usami.

In Danganronpa Another Episode: Ultra Despair Girls (2014), set between the first and second games, a new arm of Monokuma robots is commanded by the Warriors of Hope to kill every adult within Towa City. Komaru Naegi and her partner Toko Fukawa fight off the forces of Monokuma with the assistance of A.I. ally Shirokuma, inhabiting an all-white Monokuma body, while the Warriors of Hope are overseen by an all-black gangster-themed Kurokuma variant. Followers of the Warriors of Hope and Ultimate Despair additionally wear masks based on Monokuma. Ultimately, the Monokuma army is revealed to have been mass-produced by Tokuichi Towa for the forces of Ultimate Despair while also producing weapons for the Future Foundation to fight them, war profiteering, before their factory was commandeered by the Warriors of Hope and surrogate daughter and heir of the Towa Group, Monaca Towa. Both Shirokuma's and Kurokuma's A.I. systems are revealed to be those of the Alter Ego Junko Enoshima, who commands a giant Monokuma named Big Bang Monokuma against Toko and Komaru. Upon being defeated, the pair's A.I. systems are retrieved by Izuru Kamukura, sparking the chain of events leading to Danganronpa 2: Goodbye Despair.

In Danganronpa V3: Killing Harmony (2017), another Monokuma emerges at the Ultimate Academy for Gifted Juveniles, apparently having captured the last 16 survivors of Earth to participate in another killing game. Accompanied by a group of "Monokubs" whom he refers to as his children, this Monokuma continues in his role as gamemaster and executioner throughout the game. He and Tsumugi manipulate Kaede into thinking she killed Rantaro and wrongfully execute her by torturing her to death. He also offers advice to Kokichi Oma when he offers to make the killing game more interesting by implanting a flashback light into the virtual world, which leads to Miu and Gonta's deaths. Later, Kokichi impersonates the mastermind, leaving Monokuma unaware of either the victim or the culprit of the fifth chapter by disabling his security camera system, the microscopic Nanokumas, with an electrobomb, leading him to join the game as a participant. In the sixth chapter, Monokuma is revealed to be the host of Danganronpa, a reality television series based on the original Danganronpa series, which is now in its 53rd season, and operated by an A.I. produced by a Monokuma-making machine dubbed "Motherkuma" for Team Danganronpa. After the remaining killing game participants refuse to vote for either hope or despair, and Shuichi leads a persuasion of the audience as revenge, the audience watching the series begins to tune out, and the series is cancelled. Realizing that the killing games are over, Monokuma and Tsumugi Shirogane request that K1-B0 execute them while destroying the Ultimate Academy for Gifted Juveniles, the pair being crushed by a falling rock while sadly waving to a no-longer-watching audience.

=== Anime ===
In the Future Arc of Danganronpa 3: The End of Hope's Peak High School, a series of recorded messages of Monokuma is used by Kazuo Tengan to launch the "Monokuma Hunter" killing game, brainwashing its partakers to follow its orders. Monaca Towa is also depicted in the episode "Ultra Despair Girls" as still wielding an army of Monokuma robots. In the Despair Arc of Danganronpa 3: The End of Hope's Peak High School, Monokuma is shown to have been designed by Junko Enoshima based on the logo for Hope's Peak Academy, serving as the symbol of his red eye. Before organizing the first killing game, Junko has a stuffed toy version of Monokuma made.

Monokuma appears in the second-season episode "Fate ~The Strongest Enemy Appears; A Cruel, Inescapable Destiny; Wooser is Judged~" of Wooser's Hand-to-Mouth Life, in which he places the protagonists and title character Wooser into a class trial, resulting in his execution. The episode features a special illustration drawn by Danganronpa series artist Rui Komatsuzaki.

=== Other appearances ===
Monokuma appears in the Japanese manga adaptation of the series, written and illustrated by Touya Hajime and published by Enterbrain, as well as the spin-off Killer Killer. Monokuma is briefly featured in the light novel series Danganronpa/Zero and Danganronpa: Togami. A Japanese series of stage plays based on the series, features Nobuyo Ōyama and Tarako reprising their roles as Monokuma from the video game series.

In the Japanese edition of Re-Logic action-adventure sandbox game Terraria, published by Spike Chunsoft, Monokuma is featured as an unlockable costume for the player character.

In the Spike Chunsoft game Maid Paradise Mezase! Maid Number One!, Monokuma is featured in a minigame as a doll that can be held by one of the three titular maids.

The 143rd episode of Weekly Toro Station features a crossover event with Danganronpa 2: Goodbye Despair, featuring Sony Japan mascots Toro and Kuro with the color scheme of Monokuma.

In 2013, to promote the Seth MacFarlane film Ted in Japan, United International Pictures teamed up with Spike Chunsoft in a marketing campaign involving the title character and Monokuma.

In a 2013 downloadable content to the Spike Chunsoft role-playing video games Mystery Chronicle: One Way Heroics and Conception II: Children of the Seven Stars, Monokuma is respectively featured as a playable character and a DLC enemy.

In a 2014 crossover event of the Sega horror game, Chain Chronicle, Monokuma is included as a playable character alongside fellow Danganronpa Another Episode: Ultra Despair Girls characters Komaru Naegi, Toko Fukawa, Genocide Jack / Genocide Jill and Byakuya Togami, where their storylines in the event depict the group as they seek to return home to their original universe.

In the 2014 Nitroplus visual novel Motto! SoniComi, a Monokuma and Monomi hoodie and pair of hand puppets are made available for Super Sonico in the in-game "Ouka Shop".

In three crossover events beginning in 2015, Divine Gate features six different type variants of Monokuma as well as a character wearing a Monokuma mascot suit named Baum Monokuma. In the 2015 Spike Chunsoft action-adventure and role-playing games Exist Archive: The Other Side of the Sky and GachiTora! Abarenbou Kyoushi in High School, a Monokuma mascot suit is included as an alternate costume for respective protagonists Kujo Kanata and Torao Kaji, in addition to the 2017 roguelike rhythm video game Crypt of the NecroDancer.

In a Danganronpa V3: Killing Harmony-themed DLC to the 2018 Q-Games tower defense games PixelJunk Monsters 2, masks based on Monokuma, Monomi, and the Monokubs are featured. In the 2018 dungeon crawling role-playing video game Zanki Zero: Last Beginning, Monokuma is featured as a minor antagonist.

In the 2018 action hack and slash video game Attack on Titan 2: Future Coordinates, Monokuma is featured both in a cameo appearance as a Titan, and as an unlockable costume for the player characters Eren Yeager, Mikasa Ackerman, and Levi Ackerman.

Monokuma is depicted in the 2019 Spike Chunsoft game AI: The Somnium Files, in which protagonists Date and his A.I. Aiba discover a drawing of two Monokuma robots in the titular somnium, and mention the character if a panda ride is examined; the game is additionally implied to be set in the same fictional universe as Danganronpa in the resulting conversation between the duo. Monokuma is included as a playable character in a 2020 crossover event of the NetEase horror game, Identity V, where he pursues fellow Danganronpa characters Makoto Naegi and Kyoko Kirigiri with a hammer, with the intent of executing them. In a 2021 event, Monokuma pursues Hajime Hinata/Izuru Kamukura, Nagito Komaeda, Chiaki Nanami, Mikan Tsumiki, and Monomi/Usami.

== Promotion and reception ==
In December 2020, Japanese fashion brand Estryllia Enhillia announced a clothing line featuring a range of dresses, accessories, and unisex clothing pieces themed around Danganronpa characters to tie in with the 10th anniversary of Danganronpa: Trigger Happy Havoc, including Monokuma, Junko Enoshima, Kyoko Kirigiri, Makoto Naegi, Byakuya Togami, and Toko Fukawa.

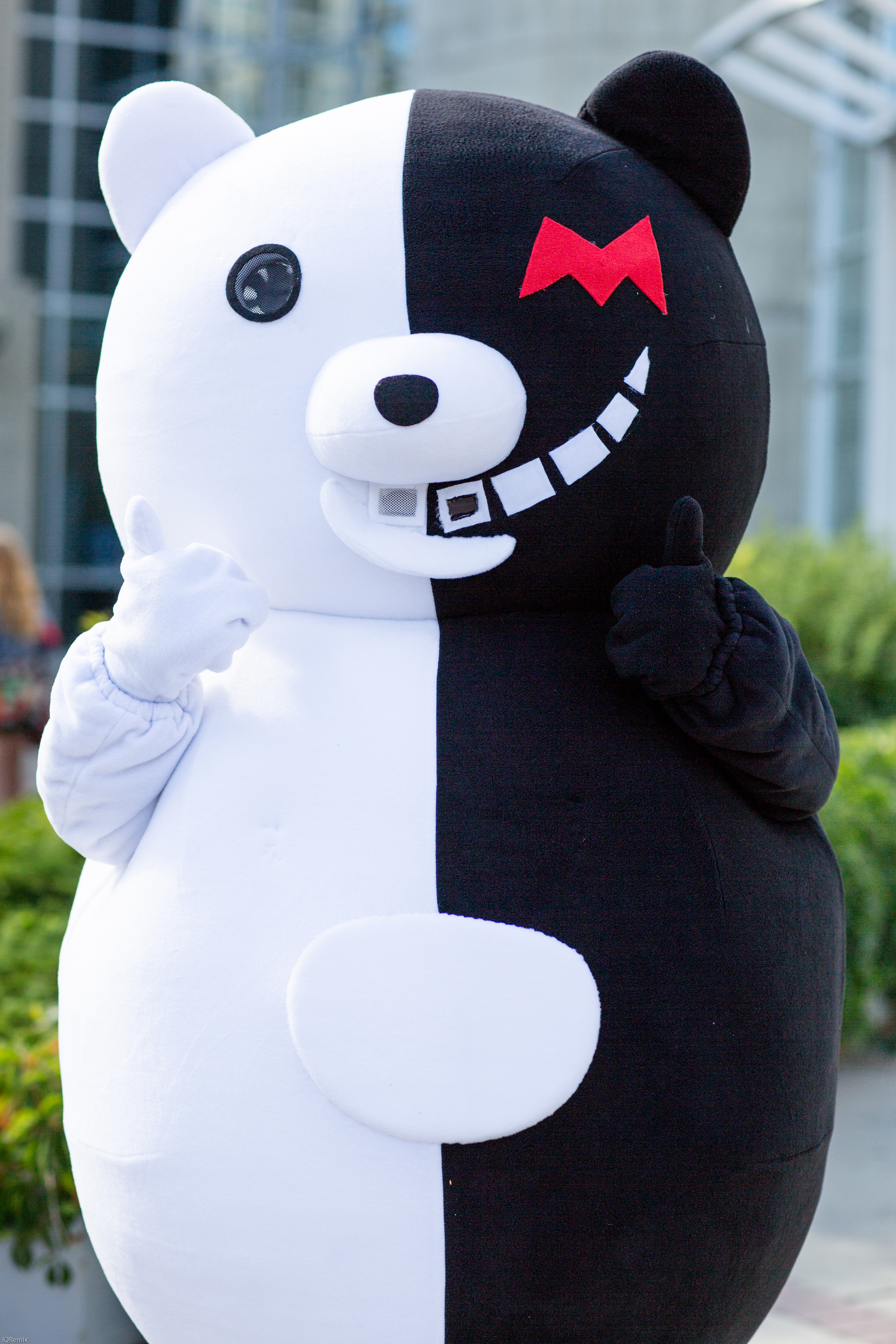
Monokuma cosplays are popular among Danganronpa fans, although in 2019 one brought to a Whataburger was the subject of controversy.

Since the release of Danganronpa: Trigger Happy Havoc in November 2010, Monokuma (and their initial mastermind Junko Enoshima) has become one of its most popular characters, with several memes being made about him. Monokuma and Junko were collectively named as the "Most Popular Game Character for Cosplay" in the Guinness World Records Gamer's Edition in 2018. In 2020, Comic Book Resources praised Monokuma as the ninth scariest character in horror anime, describing them "every bit as unfeeling, and dissonantly camp as [the] death game demanded and ha[ving] the kind of short temper and spoiled attitude that makes a hostage situation all the more volatile.", in particular praising the special "Monokuma Song" opening used for one episode of Danganronpa: The Animation. Yuzuru Hanyu's performance in the 2014 Winter Olympics led to an illustration of the athlete skating alongside a parody of Monokuma and Winnie-the-Pooh. Ogata enjoyed the reference, claiming ignorance of the planned event. Game Informer awarded him the "Best Character" award for his game appearances while Hardcore Gamer also awarded it the same category for the sequel. Multiple gamers were attracted by Danganronpa due to Nobuyo Ōyama's voice acting as Monokuma, with several staff members agreeing that Ōyama is quite popular within the fandom. Ōyama was especially noted for shocking the Japanese audience due to her dark character, especially since she is famous for doing voice acting for a popular anime character named Doraemon from the series of the same name, particularly famous with a young audience due to the lighthearted tone the series has. Hardcore Gaming 101 also compared Monokuma with Persona 4 character Teddie and felt the bear puns and the English voice acting were also outstanding to make Monokuma more popular.

US Gamer enjoyed Monokuma's characterization and the "deliberately unsettling amount of glee" the character professes during the game's execution scenes, with Study Breaks praising the character as one "[who] represents depression and mental illness, which can make you feel like you are caught in all this despair that's ultimately inescapable." Kotaku acclaimed the characterisation of Monokuma as "break[ing] free of traditional storyline clichés and offer[ing] an unpredictable and addictive experience, [with] their dark humour mak[ing] even Monokuma compelling and offer[ing] a fascinating look into the motives behind human behaviour.", in addition to their presence as "a constant source of nonsense [who] will make you crack a smile, [while being] absolutely abhorrent but unhinged and nutty with it.", while praising "the black and white design of the character [a]s both cute and fearsome". The Gamer listed him as the best Danganronpa character based on their cute and cuddly yet sinister physical appearance, praising them as "[p]erhaps the most fascinating, and most frightening character of the Danganronpa series." Polygon complimented how the character's "words teeter between mischievous and psychopathic in the same breath", while Manga News lauded the deviations in the character's monologues in the manga adaptation of the series.

In November 2019, a Monokuma costume created controversy in Austin, Texas after drag queen Erika Klash was denied entry to a Whataburger while dressed as the character, after performing in-character at the Austin International Drag Festival at the club Elysium for five years. Klash later received an apology from a Whataburger representative over the incident, both in-person and on Twitter.
