= Danganronpa 3 =

Danganronpa 3 may refer to:

- Danganronpa 3: The End of Hope's Peak High School, a Japanese anime television series and direct sequel to the video game Danganronpa 2: Goodbye Despair.
- Danganronpa V3: Killing Harmony, a 2017 video game and the third main entry in the franchise, which begins a new storyline for the series.
