= Danganronpa 2 =

Danganronpa 2 may refer to:

- Danganronpa 2: Goodbye Despair, a 2012 visual novel
- Danganronpa 2×2, a visual novel scheduled to release in 2026
