= Makoto Naegi =

Fictional character in the Danganronpa franchise

- Danganronpa character
- Promotional artwork for Makoto Naegi in Danganronpa: Trigger Happy Havoc
- First appearance: Danganronpa: Trigger Happy Havoc (2010)
- Created by: Kazutaka Kodaka
- Designed by: Rui Komatsuzaki
- Voiced by: EN: Bryce Papenbrook; JA: Megumi Ogata
- Portrayed by: Kanata Hongō (stage play); Shun Nishime (stage play)

Makoto Naegi (Japanese: 苗木 誠, Hepburn: Naegi Makoto) is a fictional character introduced as the protagonist of the 2010 visual novel adventure game Danganronpa: Trigger Happy Havoc by Spike Chunsoft. A fairly optimistic but otherwise average student who is selected in a raffle to enroll in Hope's Peak Academy as the "Ultimate Lucky Student", Makoto finds himself before a remote-controlled robotic stuffed bear named Monokuma upon entering the academy, who states that he and his fellow students will be imprisoned in the academy for the rest of their lives unless one of them becomes "the blackened" and murders another without being found out by the other students, prompting the character to solve crimes and be declared the "Ultimate Hope". Makoto returns in the game's sequels and in multiple adaptations featuring him in new story arcs, most notably in Lerche's 2016 anime series Danganronpa 3: The End of Hope's Peak High School, as a member of an organization known as the Future Foundation that seeks to take his life in a new killing game.

Writer Kazutaka Kodaka created Makoto to differ from previous visual novel protagonists. He aimed to have Makoto be a more active character than previous heroes in the narrative; his older characterization from the sequel was more complex, as he becomes more mature when engaging others. While Makoto is described as an average teenager among outstanding students, artist Rui Komatsuzaki designed him to have appealing clothing. Megumi Ogata voices him in Japanese while Bryce Papenbrook provides his voice for the English dub.

Critical response to Makoto's character has been generally positive for his role in the first game as a detective and the bonds he can form in the school during the video game. Video game and anime publications praised the voice actors' deliveries for making the character an appealing hero. Critics found his return in the sequel The End of Hope's Peak High School appealing because of his ideals and the handling of his relationships. Makoto has also been a popular character, often being listed as one of the best characters from the series.

== Creation ==
Unused artwork of Makoto Naegi by Rui Komatsuzaki

During early stages of the game Danganronpa: Trigger Happy Havoc, a demo named Distrust, Makoto was simply named "Protagonist" (主人公, Shujinkō). Writer Kazutaka Kodaka from Spike Chunsoft said in an interview that his aim was not to have players project themselves onto Makoto Naegi, a common method of writing for visual novels. In the initial stages of the game's development, it belonged to this genre. Kodaka said the main purpose of Makoto's interactions with the rest of the cast was to show how different he was from the cast of Danganronpa. While he kept writing, "Makoto started to grow through the story and forced him to eventually act." This led to Makoto becoming a more active character in the first game. As time passed, Kazutaka thought of Makoto as a strong main character who can solve cases on his own, something he wanted to change for future games. Producer Yoshinori Terasawa aimed to balance the cast and to connect with the audience; this was done mostly with Makoto. Since Makoto does not share the unique attributes of the other students, Terasawa tried to make him stand out so that players would connect with him.

In developing Makoto's characterization, Kodaka wanted to impress gamers with the early twist that happens to one of his friends. His old high school friend Sayaka Maizono, who was promoted as the game's heroine, is the first character to die in the game. As the player inspects the murder, it is revealed that the young girl wanted to frame Makoto for a murder she would cause. After framing Sayaka's murderer, Leon Kuwata, Makoto reflects on her late friend's intentions and has to live with this burden. The fact that Sayaka wanted to frame Makoto was included to generate a major impact not only on the player but also the character, resulting in the main character feeling badly over how he would be treated.

Although Makoto and his partner Kyoko Kirigiri interact in the game multiple times, Kodaka claimed he never wrote the latter to be the former's love interest. Instead, the interactions between Makoto and his supporting characters were created due to the latter's skills as a detective which would help the player at solving cases. In order to balance the cast, Kodaka conceived the idea of giving the students lose parts of their past. As a result, Kyoko does not stand out in the narrative due to her lack of detective skills resulting into the multiple collaborations the two teenagers make when solving murders.

Artist Rui Komatsuzaki designed Makoto. From the planning stages, the team wanted a protagonist lacking individuality. It proved difficult to come up with a contrast to the more outstanding designs from Dangaronpa. Originally, the team intended the adventure part of the game to be seen from a third-person perspective which would later be adopted for the spin-off Danganronpa Another Episode: Ultra Despair Girls. So, Komatsuzaki designed the character to wear a hoodie to complement his look, thinking the player was going to see his back a lot. After that, the artist added some character to his hair by adding an "antenna" and highlighted his "herbivore nature" by making him short. His coloring is subdued, but Komtatsuzaki used a color palette he enjoyed.

In the first sequel, Danganronpa 2: Goodbye Despair, a new character named Nagito Komaeda was introduced with the same Lucky Talent as Makoto. However, the staff considered them opposites based on their ideals of "hope". To surprise gamers and suggest the characters are potentially the same person, both Makoto and Nagito share the same voice actress, Ogata. His name, "Nagito Komaeda", was conceived as an anagram for "Naegi Makoto da" ("I am Makoto Naegi").

Localization member Robert Schiotis felt that finding a voice actor for the latter proved too challenging, as he is meant to clash with Makoto's ideals. In the end, Papenbrook voiced both characters, making the connections between them more interesting according to localization staff. In 2020, Kodaka revealed the anagram was used to engage fans of Danganronpa: Trigger Happy Havoc because of the lack of pre-release promotion materials for the original version of Goodbye Despair during its release year. This surprised Ogata as it was kept hidden from the other members who developed the game.

=== Casting ===
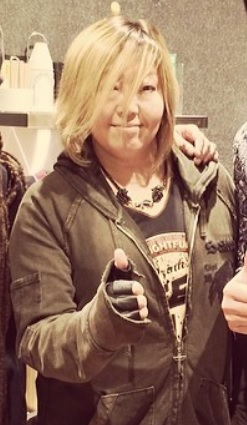
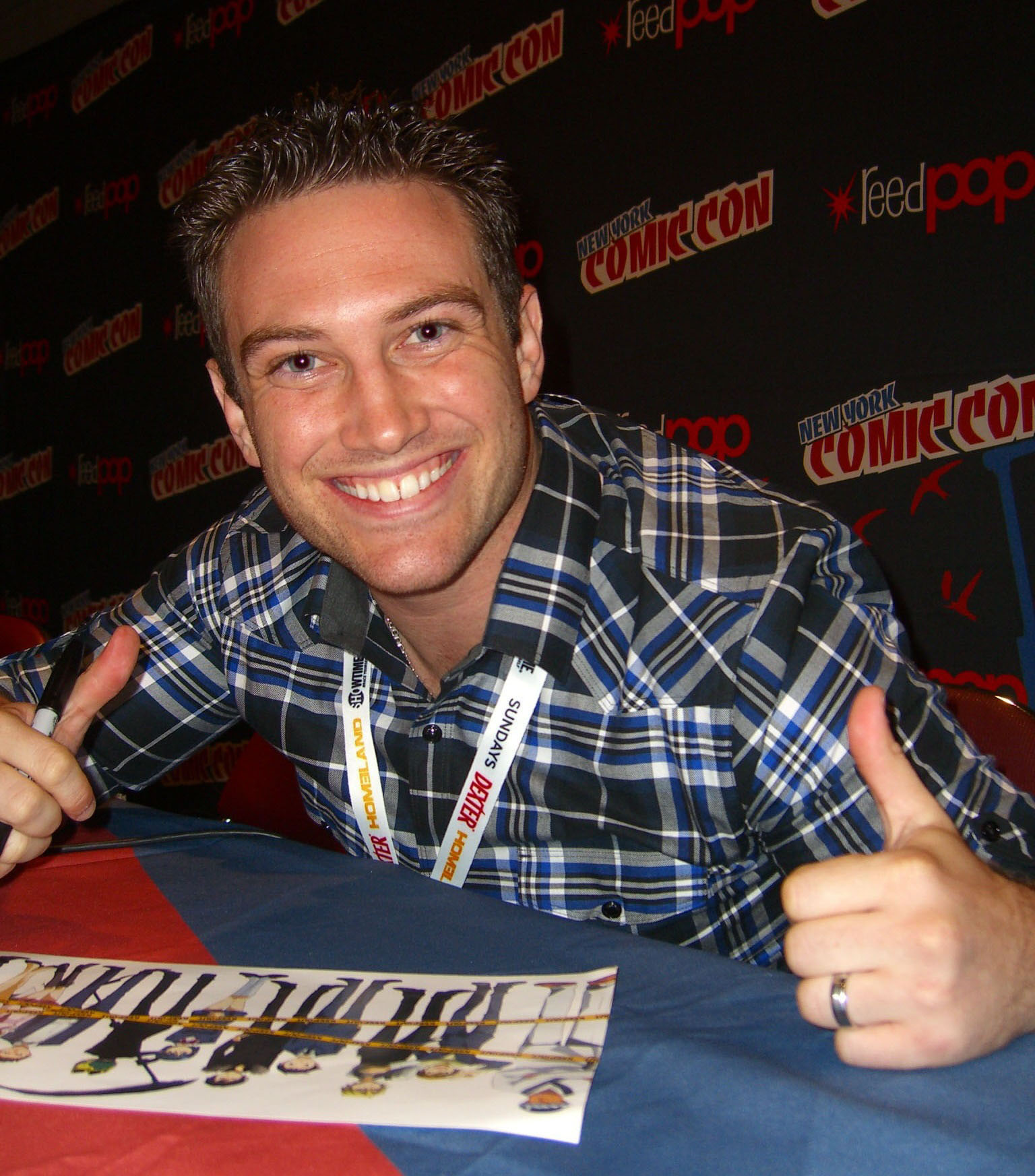
Megumi Ogata (left) and Bryce Papenbrook (right) voiced Makoto Naegi in Japanese and English versions, respectively.

In the original Japanese version of the Danganronpa series, Megumi Ogata voiced Makoto Naegi. Because Makoto lacked talent, in contrast to the rest of the cast of the first game, Ogata referred to her character as an audience surrogate. The series' anime adaptation used the same execution. The actress referred to the protagonist as a reluctant detective because of his role in the narrative as he is forced to solve trials to survive and protect the other innocent students. Because of budget issues, some lines were cut. In retrospect, this left Ogata wanting to voice them because she felt they were important. She had a similar feeling about the anime adaptation, which she also felt had been cut too much. Kodaka claimed some lines did not befit Makoto such as when the player is exploring an area. He said they would have added more fitting lines if Spike had had the budget for the game.

In the series' English dub, Bryce Papenbrook voices Makoto. Papenbrook found that his "young" voice not only allowed him to voice Makoto but other lead characters from the anime including Eren Yeager from Attack on Titan or Shirou Emiya from Fate/stay night among others. He enjoyed voicing Makoto in the first game as well as the anime series and looked forward to people hearing his work. In the original Japanese series, there is a scene in the finale where Nagito talks in joy while holding hand with Makoto, whom he declares his idol for their similar talents but is taken by his friends before he can finish their interactions. Papenbrook added a line for Nagito that would come across comically as homoerotic to which Makoto would reply calmly in confusion and claimed he had fun for making his two characters had a talk.

Kanata Hongō played Makoto in the stage play of the first game. In the anime series, Shun Nishime took on the role, and claimed his character was an ideal hero based on his actions presented in the high school scenario. Hongō would later voice the protagonist of Death Come True, a young man named Makoto Karaki. Kodaka felt he was knowledgeable about his style of writing after Danganronpa and felt his acting would be suitable for the work. However, he said there were no connections between the Makotos even if gamers felt there were similarities.

== Characterization and themes ==
Makoto was redesigned for End of Hope's Peak High School, as a more mature character.

Initially, Makoto was written as an unreliable teenager but Kodaka changed his mind upon seeing the performance of voice actress Megumi Ogata. Kodaka was surprised by Ogata's work so he decided to make Makoto stronger most notably in the game's finale when Makoto confronts the game's masterimind. Ogata found this type of characterization common in her career and compared Makoto to the "ordinary" mecha pilot Shinji Ikari from the anime Neon Genesis Evangelion. Nevertheless, Ogata felt Makoto possesses a unique talent that allows him to stand out despite his weak appearance.

Ogata described Makoto as an optimistic teenager, making him a more responsible person whenever something chaotic happens during his appearances, even if he doubts his skills. As the franchise touches on themes of "hope", Ogata felt Makoto embodies the philosophy of hope as he brings this to the narrative and the setting. Analyzing these themes further, Ogata said Danganronpa often touches on both elements of despair and hope. The characters experience "despair" while they are trapped in the school and Makoto provides more emotional support to the cast across the story, giving the actress a far more optimistic message that the students are going to survive. Since the anime Danganronpa: The Animation had a bigger budget than the game, Ogata felt that Makoto "finally gelled" in the anime as a character as there was more voice acting.

For the anime series Danganronpa 3: The End of Hope's Peak High School, Kodaka aimed to produce a unique style of storytelling. As a result, the writer divided Makoto's group from Hajime's. Makoto's story and themes are those of hope in contrast to Hajime's which are of despair. For the anime sequel, according to director Seiji Kishi, Komatsuzaki redesigned Makoto and his friends to look more mature. To attract more fans, Makoto's first image as an adult shows him handcuffed based on Kishi's ideas.

Makoto's relationship with Kyoko was written to implicate a more intimate tone than in the original game. Kodaka carefully planned this through a scene where Kyoko takes off her gloves for the first time in the series in order to comfort Makoto. This was also meant to provide a parallel between the romantic relationship between two other characters from the same series, Kyosuke Munakata and Chisa Yukizome who are also implied to be involved romantically.

Kodaka changed Kyosuke Munakata's sacrifice from script because he wanted Makoto to move forward carrying the burden of hope, elements often discussed by the cast. As a result, the plan was to include what happens to different characters after the Hope Arc during the credits, but they were cut for length. Kodaka cried watching the scene of Makoto confronting Munakata, especially because of Megumi Ogata's acting. Higa believes it was thanks to Makoto's role in the anime that Kyosuke became more appealing following their interactions. In retrospective, Kodaka regrets the focus Junko had on Makoto's traits as while they are mutual enemies in the first game, he instead wanted him to be seen from the perspective of Junko's sister, Mukuro Ikusaba, to provide another way to look at the character.

== Appearances ==
=== Danganronpa video games ===
The protagonist of Danganronpa: Trigger Happy Havoc, Makoto Naegi is an ordinary high school student who was accepted to Hope's Peak Academy through a lottery and given the title of Ultimate Lucky Student (超高校級の「幸運」, Chō-kōkō-kyū no "Kōun"; lit. Super High School Level Good Luck), having no spectacular talents aside from his belief that he is more optimistic than most people. After awakening in the school to find it in lockdown and a bear-like robot named Monokuma offering the 15 students trapped the right to leave if one among their number becomes "the blackened" and kills another without being found out by the other students at a subsequently held class trial and executed themselves, Makoto is manipulated by his former classmate and pop star Sayaka Maizono into switching rooms with her to allow her to attempt to kill Leon Kuwata and frame Makoto for the crime. Despite his disappointment at being manipulated by Sayaka, Makoto aims to solve the class trials and uncover each new "blackened" as more students decide to kill to escape, assisted by Kyoko Kirigiri, who possesses keen observational and deductive skills.

In an alternate ending to Trigger Happy Havoc in which Kyoko is executed after being blamed for killing the 16th student Mukuro Ikusaba, Makoto loses his will to fight in the next trials and establishes a polyamorous relationship with Byakuya Togami, Yasuhiro "Hiro" Hagakure, and Aoi "Hina" Asahina, with whom he has a child. In the regular route, Makoto avoids incriminating Kyoko and is nearly executed by Monokuma after being accused and convicted of murdering Mukuro by his fellow students, before being saved by an artificial intelligence named Alter Ego and returning to confront Monokuma in a final class trial, in which he is instrumental in solving all the murder mysteries and foils of Monokuma's plot: Monokuma is revealed to be Mukuro's twin sister and true murderer, Junko Enoshima. Junko reveals that Makoto and the students had already attended Hope's Peak Academy for two years and had sealed themselves inside of the school themselves the previous year in order to hide from the fallout of an apocalyptic crisis that had started in the school known as The Tragedy, and that she had erased their memories from that time to ensure their willing participation in the killing game. When Junko tries to protect the students from the outside world by offering Makoto's life in exchange for the right to remain in the academy, Makoto instead encourages his friends to face an uncertain reality, earning the title of Ultimate Hope (超高校級の「希望」, Chō-kōkō-kyū no "Kibō"; lit. Super High School Level Hope) from Kyoko. Junko consents to be executed herself in response. Shortly afterward, Makoto escapes from the academy with the rest of the survivors.

During the events of Danganronpa 2: Goodbye Despair, Makoto and the other survivors forcibly attempt to rehabilitate a group known as Remnants of Despair by placing them inside a virtual world which would rewrite their memories of being terrorist members. However, because of a virus containing Junko's Alter Ego inserted by former Ultimate Hope Hajime Hinata, the world is turned into another killing game, leading Makoto, Kyoko, and Byakuya to enter the virtual world themselves to help the surviving students activate a shutdown sequence to stop Junko, who reveals her goal to have been to confine their minds in the program and download herself into their bodies. Beating the game unlocks the novel Danganronpa: Trigger Happy Havoc IF where Makoto takes alternate from the original game where he meets Mukuro in her Junko persona before her death. Attached to Makoto, Mukuro fights her sister to save the wounds he took previously.

In the spin-off Danganronpa Another Episode: Ultra Despair Girls, set between the events of the first two games, Makoto is depicted as an agent of the Future Foundation, dedicated to rebuilding society while searching for his sister Komaru. Thanks to Toko, Komaru is saved and the siblings contact each other. Sometime later, Byakuya informs Makoto over a separate video call that Komaru has elected to remain in the city with Toko to search for their parents. Makoto appears as a persona taken on by the new mastermind, and as a supporting character in the game demo throughout Danganronpa V3: Killing Harmony in apparent flashbacks of the life of new killing game participant Shuichi Saihara. Makoto is also present in the action video game Danganronpa: Unlimited Battle and the virtual reality tech demo Cyber Danganronpa VR: The Class Trial.

=== Danganronpa anime ===
Makoto appears as the protagonist of Danganronpa: The Animation, adapting Danganronpa: Trigger Happy Havoc. He also returns as the lead of the Future Arc of the anime Danganronpa 3: The End of Hope's Peak High School. Set sometime after the events of Danganronpa 2: Goodbye Despair, with Makoto having been arrested by Future Foundation vice-chairman Kyosuke Munakata for treason after he had protected the Remnants of Despair from prosecution, Makoto is put on trial for his actions. However, they are imprisoned by a new Monokuma, who forces everyone present to participate in a final killing game, while trying to avoid being poisoned to death by personalized forbidden actions. Makoto is forbidden from running in the hallway, making him inactive; Kyosuke orders his underlings to murder him, believing he is the actual culprit using Monokuma and filled with rage due to the first victim of the game being his close friend and lover Chisa Yukizome. Makoto is then saved from Kyosuke by Kazuo Tengan, the chairman of the Future Foundation.

As the killing game progresses, Makoto ends up unintentionally triggering Kyoko's forbidden action and apparent death. Makoto is encouraged by Kyoko's last words to bring an end to the Final Killing Game. Makoto faces Kyosuke again and traps him in a locked room having deduced his forbidden action was being opening doors. Makoto forces him to confront Chisa's death and regain his hope. Following the encounter Makoto deduces that Kazuo had been using the killing game to manipulate the Ultimate Animator and former associate of Junko. Upon testing the culprit's modus operandi, Makoto learns there is no killer and instead all victims committed suicide upon seeing brainwashing videos caused by Junko's pawn Ryota Mitarai. Ryota aims to air a new video worldwide, ultimately leaving the entire world emotionless. In the Hope Arc of Danganronpa 3: The End of Hope's Peak High School, Makoto races to face Ryota and end the game. With the aid of the Remnants of Despair, Makoto manages to stop Ryota. Kyosuke then leaves Makoto in charge of bringing hope to the world and goes off to shoulder his burden. As Makoto reflects on his actions, he is approached by Kyoko, having been revived by Mikan Tsumiki. Sometime later, Makoto is seen in a rebuilt Hope's Peak Academy alongside Kyoko, as the school's new headmaster.

In the Despair Arc of Danganronpa 3: The End of Hope's Peak High School, a young Makoto appears in Hope's Peak Academy where his good luck saves him from being killed by a wrench Junko throws at him. Makoto remains unaware of the attack and his luck during the episode, after which point Junko decides to keep him alive as a "wild card", setting the events of Danganronpa: Trigger Happy Havoc. A virtual replica of Makoto additionally appears in the original video animation Nagito Komaeda and the Destroyer of Worlds dating Sayaka.

=== Danganronpa printed media ===
Makoto makes minor cameo appearances in the light novel series Danganronpa/Zero, in which Ryoko Otonashi briefly encounters him while fleeing the Ultimate Bodyguard, the seventh volume of Danganronpa: Kirigiri, in which Kyoko Kirigiri meets him while attending Hope's Peak Academy, and the third volume of Danganronpa: Togami, in which he prepares Hope's Peak Academy for lockdown upon the commencement of "The Tragedy". Makoto also appears in the manga series Killer Killer, in which an effigy of him is built to be publicly executed in an arena, and in a manga adaptation of the first game written by Hajime Tōya and Takashi Tsukimi He is also present in a series of comedy shorts based on The End of Hope's Peak High School.

A short story booklet titled Danganronpa: Makoto Naegi Secret File – The Worst Day Ever (ダンガンロンパ Makoto Naegi Secret File 苗木誠、人生最悪の日, Naegi Makoto, Jinsei Saiaku no Hi), written by Kazutaka Kodaka, was included with special editions of the first Japanese Blu-ray and DVD release of Danganronpa: The Animation, serving as an origin story relating how Makoto came to be selected as the "Ultimate Lucky Student" of Hope's Peak Academy. His luck led to the original female candidate intended for the role being replaced after unknowingly destroying her acceptance letter; a new lottery is held. His bad luck is so powerful that it cancels the good luck of anyone around him. On the rare occasion when his good luck manifests itself, it is immensely powerful in its own right, allowing outcomes that are nearly statistically impossible,

=== Other appearances ===
Makoto appears in the Spike Chunsoft game Mystery Chronicle: One Way Heroics alongside Komaru Naegi, where there are designs available for the game's Ultimate Student class. Makoto also appears in Crypt of the NecroDancer and Identity V as alternative costumes for the main character, along with characters from series developed by Spike Chunsoft like Mystery Dungeon: Shiren the Wanderer and Kenka Bancho. The Danganronpa 3 incarnation of the character is also present in a collaboration with Hōkai Gakuen 2, a Chinese side-scrolling shooter mobile game developed by miHoYo for iOS and Android. He is present in a collaboration illustration between Danganronpa and the anime Akudama Drive. In December 2020, Japanese fashion brand Estryllia Enhillia announced a clothing line featuring a range of dresses, accessories, and unisex clothing pieces themed around Danganronpa characters to tie in with the 10th anniversary of Danganronpa: Trigger Happy Havoc, including other characters and him. Clothing by Amnibus was also created.

== Reception ==
Makoto has been a popular character. In a popularity poll from the franchise for the collected release of Trigger Happy Havoc and Goodbye Despair, Makoto took the first spot. During the 10th anniversary of the franchise, staff members received multiple messages from fans who were inspired by Makoto's actions and ideals in the first Danganronpa game despite the dark character's dark narrative with Ogata herself often getting these responses by the players. Comic Book Resources said he was an intelligent character, citing how he solves cases despite initially being passive during his debut, with TheGamer adding his dynamic with Kyoko helps become a better character. Manga News specifically mentioned his bond with Kyoko Kirigiri not only when it comes to solving cases but also opening up to one another. Despite appearing as an unlikely hero, TheGamer still felt Makoto manages to come across as a proper hero in the end of the game. Eurogamer said that Makoto highly contradicts the series' cast due to him not having any particular talent as he was chosen by luck but finds his journey painful to watch as the protagonist is unable to help other students who are in danger from being killed or becoming killers. The narrative of Danganronpa makes the player connect with Makoto by experience the murders and executions despite their friendships. Among relationships, Screenrant regarded his rivalry with Byakuya as one the best in anime praising how, despite the two of them competing to solve crimes, there are times the two rely on each other. The same site noted Makoto is not a traditional rpg protagonist due to having several flaws to surpass across the game which he succeeds at. In an analysis from the series, The A.V. Club notes Makoto's characterization is an exception to the type of other talented students seen in the story who are obsessed with their talents and how much superior they can be in the process and is not obsessed with his identity. This lack of superiority allows Makoto to be a more rationalized character who is able to see through murders, showing a notable growth in the finale which can be shown as a symbolism of graduating from school.

In regards to the adaptations of Danganronpa, critics had mixed reaction about Makoto's handling in the manga as it had to adapt the visual novel-like game, resulting into multiple expositions through his thoughts and dialogues as well as whether he or not continues being the audience surrogate based on how he solves cases alone rather than relying on the player's actions. Nevertheless, ReviewFix felt that despite his average appearance might result into looking down on, his actions when outsmarting killer during trials make Makoto comes across as the most appealing character. Critics had mixed feelings about Makoto's appearances in the anime adaptation from Lerche based on whether his actions solving cases are properly adapted when incriminating culprits compared to his game persona. In the Gale Academic OneFile, David Eckstein-Schoemann noted that while Makoto is a common archetype the way, the anime handles him makes him interesting to watch. On the other hand, GameRant believed Makoto is more enjoyable in the visual novel than in the anime because the length the former work features allows the audience to follow a more mature take on his characterization in contrast to the shorter TV series. Although Makoto is not a prominent figure in Danganronpa 2, several writers were confused with the multiple similarities between the character Nagito Komaeda and him. His role in Danganronpa/Zero was also well received by Kotaku for how he interacts with the main character.

Makoto's role in the Danganronpa 3: The End of Hope's Peak High School was a source of positive reaction. Critics saw him as a tragic hero because the new cast suspect him of being a criminal and he is antagonized by multiple members from the Future Foundation, especially Kyosuke Munakata. His deeper relationship with Kyoko was also praised by Caitlin Glass among critics due to Kyoko's support to Makoto despite believing she will not survive the next time the cast falls asleep. Manga.Tokyo and Fandom Post further noted how the love Makoto felt towards Kyoko and her last words towards to him made the character become more powerful. In a scene from the anime, Makoto is nearly driven to killing himself to understand the culprit's modus operandi, the scene itself was one of the darkest scenes by THEM Anime Reviews' Tim Jones with David Lynn finding it more fitting on to expand Makoto's survivor guilt and how each of this late friends represent Makoto's failures to bring them hope in the original game. In regards to the series' finale, critics felt the anime brought closure to Makoto's story properly not only for his growth but also because he still continues his bond with the revived Kyoko.
