= Danganronpa: Unlimited Battle =

2015 video game

- Title screen featuring (from left to right) Hajime Hinata, Monokuma, and Makoto Naegi
- Developer: Spike Chunsoft
- Publisher: Spike Chunsoft
- Series: Danganronpa
- Platforms: Android, iOS
- Release: iOS: JP: January 7, 2015; Android: JP: April 17, 2015
- Genre: Action
- Modes: Single-player, multiplayer

Danganronpa: Unlimited Battle (Note: Japanese: ダンガンロンパ-Unlimited Battle-) is a 2015 action video game developed and published by Spike Chunsoft. A part of the Danganronpa series, it was released in Japan for Android and iOS before ceasing operations later in 2015. The gameplay involved using the touchscreen to shoot the characters from the player's team, as with billiards, towards enemies in a confined arena-like area. The game was free to play and was supported by microtransactions.

Video game journalists questioned the choice to use the Danganronpa series to create a touchscreen-based action game, but still felt that it should be given a chance; one noted however that the game retained the style of the previous games in the series, and one called it unusually good for its genre. Over 700,000 players had registered for the game.

== Gameplay ==
The player shoots their characters towards enemies in a billiards-like fashion.

Contrary to the visual novels Danganronpa: Trigger Happy Havoc and Danganronpa 2: Goodbye Despair, Unlimited Battle is a co-operative action video game, possible to be played by one to four players at a time, and had no plot. The player would choose three Danganronpa characters, recreated in a chibi art style, and be accompanied by a fourth character from another player's game in a confined arena-like area together with a number of enemy characters. The game is split into missions, each including a number of such arenas, followed by a boss battle. When the player finished certain missions and other tasks, they were rewarded with the in-game currency Monokuma Coins. By spending such coins, the player could receive continues, gashapon-like unlockable content, refill their in-game stamina, and buy cards that were not otherwise available through playing the game.

Using touch controls, the player aims with one of their characters and shoot them towards enemies like billiards, with the character bouncing off upon contact with enemies or walls until it runs out of momentum. After the player's turn is over, the enemies do the same thing, and attack the player's characters. With a certain number of turns passed, the player can choose to activate their characters' individual special attacks.

Defeated enemies would drop two types of items: cards, which either unlocked new characters or allowed the player to boost their characters' stats when increasing their level; and bullets, which could be used on cards that had been increased to their maximum level, to transform them into higher-ranking cards. The player could also find other power-up items scattered in the arenas, which could be used to increase the speed or strength of their characters, recover health points, or make aiming easier.

== Release and reception ==
The game was announced in December 2014 by developer Spike Chunsoft, and received a promotional video on December 24, 2014. It was released on January 7, 2015 for iOS, and on April 17, 2015 for Android. By May 2015, over 700,000 user accounts for the game had been registered. Upon release, the game was free to play and had in-app purchases, which allowed the player to buy Monocoins. In September 2015, Spike Chunsoft announced that microtransactions would be stopped on October 13, 2015, and that the game would end service a month later, on November 13.

Richard Eisenbeis at Kotaku found the game fun, requiring skill and strategy, something he noted was unusual for its genre; he did however think that it felt repetitive. Sinan Kubba of Joystiq questioned why Spike Chunsoft would choose a series known for "story of entrapment and murder mystery" as the base for a touchscreen action game, but ultimately felt the game should be given a chance based on the pedigree of the prior games in the series. Pocket Gamer's Chris Priestman echoed these sentiments, stating that it might be the oddest game in the series yet, and called the game's action "madcap" and "explosive". Alex Carlson at Hardcore Gamer said that the game looked simple, but still thought that it retained the series' "twisted style" and "bizarre charm".
