= Master Detective Archives: Rain Code =

2023 video game

- Promotional art
- Developers: Spike Chunsoft; Too Kyo Games
- Publishers: WW: Spike Chunsoft; AU: Nintendo (Switch)
- Director: Takahiro Suzuki
- Producer: Shohei Sakakibara
- Programmer: Kiyoshi Nagata
- Artists: Rui Komatsuzaki; Shimadoriru
- Writers: Kazutaka Kodaka; Takekuni Kitayama
- Composer: Masafumi Takada
- Engine: Unreal Engine 4
- Platforms: Nintendo Switch; PlayStation 5; Xbox Series X/S; Windows
- Release: Nintendo Switch; WW: June 30, 2023; PS5, Xbox Series X/S, Windows; JP: July 18, 2024; WW: October 1, 2024
- Genre: Adventure
- Mode: Single-player

Master Detective Archives: Rain Code (Note: Known in Japan as Chō Tantei Jikenbo: Rain Code (超探偵事件簿 レインコード), stylized as Master Detective Archives: RAIN CODE) is a 2023 adventure video game developed by Too Kyo Games and Spike Chunsoft, and published by Spike Chunsoft. The game, created by several members who worked on the Danganronpa series, including scenario writer Kazutaka Kodaka, character designer Rui Komatsuzaki, and composer Masafumi Takada, was first released for the Nintendo Switch on June 30, 2023. An enhanced version was released for PlayStation 5, Windows, and Xbox Series X/S on July 18, 2024, in Japan and October 1 worldwide.

The story centers around Yuma Kokohead, a trainee detective with amnesia, and his shinigami ally named Shinigami investigating an isolated, perpetually rainy city called Kanai Ward, controlled by the Amaterasu Corporation. Through a series of murder cases, Yuma and his supernaturally-powered Master Detective allies aim to discover Kanai Ward's Ultimate Secret and solve the Great Global Mystery. Finding the truth is made difficult when Amaterasu's enforcers interfere with the cases Yuma investigates, which requires him to enter an alternate dimension known as the Mystery Labyrinth, and solve the cases there by gathering the evidence needed to prove the culprits' identities.

== Gameplay ==
In the Mystery Labyrinth, players battle Mystery Phantom counterparts of the Amaterasu Corporation members per each chapter.

Master Detective Archives: Rain Code is a fantasy-mystery adventure game taking place across six chapters. Players control Yuma Kokohead, an amnesiac detective who solves incidents with the help of Shinigami. Gameplay alternates between Kanai Ward in the real world, where the story unfolds, and the Mystery Labyrinth, a dungeon formed from the mysteries surrounding a case.

During each chapter, the player explores the Kanai Ward area, where they can either progress the main story or partake in optional side quests known as Requests. By interacting with objects, speaking with characters, and completing various tasks, players earn Detective Points that increase Yuma's skill level and rewards Skill Points. Skill Points can be used to unlock various abilities that can be used in the Mystery Labyrinth. Additionally, the player can find statues of Shinigami, which can unlock optional dialogues with side characters. When an incident occurs, players search for information and clues, which are converted into Solution Keys for use in the Mystery Labyrinth. Players may also be required to take part in quick time events or minigames, some of which involve the abilities of Yuma's fellow detectives.

Once enough Solution Keys are gathered, the game moves into the Mystery Labyrinth, the spiritual manifestation of each case. Here, the player must use their wits and Solution Keys to solve the various mysteries behind a case. These involve choosing the correct route, answering questions with the correct Solution Key, and reacting to quickfire questions. Occasionally, players will face off against Mystery Phantoms, manifestations of characters trying to hide the truth, in Reasoning Death Match sections. Similar to the Danganronpa series' Nonstop Debate sections, the player must dodge statements shot out by the Mystery Phantom before striking a contradictory statement with the correct corresponding Solution Key. Players are also able to repel certain statements without evidence and call upon an ally's help to shield them from damage. The Shinigami Puzzle segments require the player to spell out the answer to a question by hitting letters on a rotating barrel within a time limit. Clues can be offered by feeding Shinigami a Solution Key, but irrelevant ones will result in less time.

When the true culprit is cornered, the player takes part in the God Shinigami section, in which the player controls a giant Shinigami as she dodges and destroys obstacles laid out by the culprit. Finally, the Deduction Denouement requires the player to fill in panels of a comic summarizing the case. The player has stamina, which decreases if they make mistakes or are hit by obstacles, with the game ending if it is diminished or if the player runs out of time. Abilities unlocked by Skill Points can be equipped to give the player benefits, such as more health or fewer incorrect Solution Keys. At the end of each chapter, players are ranked on their performance in the Mystery Labyrinth, earning Detective Points based on how well they did.

== Plot ==
Detective trainee Yuma Kokohead awakens at a train station, learning that he is to board the Amaterasu Express, a self-driving passenger train en route to Kanai Ward on an assignment. Due to his amnesia, Yuma is suspected as an impostor among the Master Detectives on board, who are members of the World Detective Organization (WDO). Encouraged to rest by detective Zilch Alexander, Yuma is knocked out in the bathroom, and reawakens to meet Shinigami, a god of death visible only to him due to a pact trading his memories for her aid. Yuma discovers the other detectives dead and is framed by Amaterasu Corporation’s Peacekeepers. Before being arrested, Shinigami pulls Yuma into a Mystery Labyrinth, an alternate dimension formed by the real-world mysteries, which they traverse to solve. There, Yuma and Shinigami discover the true killer to be a hitman impersonating Zilch hired to sabotage the Detectives' journey. This fails to prove Yuma's innocence, as solving the case kills the true culprit. Yuma is saved from the Peacekeepers by Yakou Furio, head of the local WDO agency, who acquits him and explains that Kanai Ward is an isolated, perpetually rainy city ruled by Amaterasu Corporation.

Yakou takes Yuma to the Nocturnal Detective Agency, now stationed in a submarine at a riverbank, where he meets four other Master Detectives who survived their respective trips to Kanai Ward: Halara Nightmare, Desuhiko Thunderbolt, Fubuki Clockford and Vivia Twilight. The detectives inform him of the WDO's goal of solving mysteries using powers called Forensic Fortes which assist their investigations. The WDO's leader, Number One, calls the gathered detectives to solve Kanai Ward's Ultimate Secret, which will help them solve the Great Global Mystery, but does not provide information on what either of these cases entail.

The detectives search Kanai Ward for this secret, investigating several cases such as: a serial killer priest avenging the victims of his targets, which inspires a churchgoer to commit a copycat crime, with both men pretending to be the legendary Nail Man killer; theatre club student Karen being poisoned by three of her peers, Yoshiko, Waruna and Kurane, during a school play rehearsal in a plot to avenge Karen's murder of their friend Aiko; and traitorous anti-Amaterasu resistance movement member Icardi killing the group's leader Shachi and framing Yuma for a terrorist attack on the city so he can steal enough money from the city's bank in order to escape Kanai Ward. The Detectives are frequently hindered by the Peacekeepers, led by their sadistic Director, Yomi Hellsmile. As the Detectives resolve the cases, Shinigami reaps the culprits' souls and the other detectives lose their memories upon exiting the Mystery Labyrinth after solving each case. During Yuma's investigations, he meets and befriends Kurumi Wendy, the city's informant, and Makoto Kagutsuchi, the masked CEO of Amaterasu.

Sneaking into Amaterasu's headquarters to receive confirmation of a secret homunculus research lab, the detectives are hindred by the murder of head researcher Dr. Huesca, committed by Yakou to avenge his wife's murder, leading to his reaping by the reluctant Shinigami. During the investigation into Dr. Huesca's death, Yomi's conspiring with the doctor to leak Amaterasu's technology is revealed, giving Makoto the pretext to remove Yomi from his position. Returning to the agency, the Detectives are finally informed by Number One that the Great Global Mystery is a series of global-scale kidnappings, just before the WDO is suddenly bombed, seemingly killing Number One. Makoto knocks the Detectives out with sleeping gas, taking Yuma and Kurumi to the restricted area of Kanai Ward.

Yuma discovers from his investigation in the restricted area that Amaterasu Corporation was hired by the Unified Government (UG) to create an immortal army of homunculi. The UG set up their own facility and created the first homunculus, Makoto Kagutsuchi, out of Number One's DNA three years ago, revealed to be Yuma prior to his amnesia. Desperate, Amaterasu subsequently turned all Kanai Ward residents into homunculi; however, exposure to sunlight caused them to go feral and slaughter their original human counterparts. Makoto restored their sanity and blocked out the sun using a rain cloud generator. Taking control of Kanai Ward, Makoto blackmailed the UG, assumed CEO status, halted Dr. Huesca's research, organized global kidnappings of death-row inmates to feed the homunculi processed human meat, and hid that deceased homunculi revive as zombies. Makoto brought the Detectives to Kanai Ward to remove Yomi and Dr. Huesca, planning to usurp the WDO by killing Number One in the Mystery Labyrinth to permanently isolate the city.

Yuma convinces Makoto to reveal the truth to the citizens in order to resolve the city's issues. Makoto follows through after the two safely exit the Labyrinth without having to reap Makoto's soul, at the cost of Yuma breaking his pact with Shinigami and losing all memories of her as a result. With both mysteries solved, Yuma resigns as Number One and travels the world to solve mysteries, leaving the Book of Death housing Shinigami with Kurumi. Medical advancements eventually allow the homunculi to tolerate sunlight and coexist with humanity. As the Master Detectives—their HQ's bombing having been faked—return to headquarters, Kurumi leaves Kanai Ward to search for Yuma.

=== DLC substories ===
A series of five downloadable content substories, taking place concurrently with the events of the main game, follows the supporting Master Detectives as they investigate cases of their own.

"Ch. Desuhiko: Charisma Killed the Cat" – Jealous of the attention received by the phantom thief known as the Nine-Tailed Cat, Desuhiko and Yakou stage a fake apprehension of the thief while attempting to steal the Virgo ring, intending to lure the real thief out. The plan appears to succeed when the Nine-Tailed Cat confronts Desuhiko, who is posing as a journalist named Enyne. After discovering that the thief is a woman, Desuhiko proposes to her using the ring. She accepts the ring but rejects his proposal before leaving. She later returns the ring to the museum, embarrassing Desuhiko.

"Ch. Fubuki: Fubuki's Luckiest Day" – After a fortune teller predicts that she will have an exceptionally fortunate day, Fubuki uses her time-reversal abilities to save a man who is thrown from the roof of a building. Believing that the man was targeted by a casino to prevent him from exposing its cheating, Fubuki joins Desuhiko and Halara in confronting the casino's owner and attempting to save the man's life.

"Ch. Halara: Raining Cats & Dogs" – Yakou receives a request from a woman named Tetra to investigate the mysterious drowning death of her father. He persuades Halara to assist with the case by agreeing to allow a stray cat they have been caring for to remain at the agency. Using their Forte, Halara investigates the case and identifies Tetra's fiancé, Jeryn, as the culprit.

"Ch. Vivia: The Near-Death Detective" – Yakou assigns Vivia to investigate a series of suicides at an abandoned apartment building. While investigating, Vivia becomes trapped in an elevator with a woman named Ryo. He eventually determines that Ryo is the spirit of the apartment's first suicide victim. Ryo reveals that she regrets her death and has remained at the apartment to prevent others from taking their own lives. When Vivia considers dying himself, Yakou arrives while searching for him, leading Vivia to realize that there are people who care about him.

"Ch. Yakou: Thank You, My Detective" – While wandering through the abandoned homunculus research laboratory in the restricted area, Yakou recalls an incident from five years earlier in which he rescued a woman he had been hired to locate, who later became his wife. After encountering her spirit, Yakou receives a drug she had been developing before her death. The drug is capable of rejuvenating cells, potentially allowing Yakou to repair his defective homunculus cells and properly revive himself.

== Development and release ==
Rain Code was co-developed by Spike Chunsoft and Too Kyo Games, a company formed in 2017 by ex-employees of Spike Chunsoft. It was written by Kazutaka Kodaka and Takekuni Kitayama, and features music by Masafumi Takada, and character designs by Rui Komatsuzaki and Shimadoriru; several key staff members previously worked on Spike Chunsoft's Danganronpa series.

Kodaka began the planning for the game in 2016 while he was still working at Spike Chunsoft. It was designed to be different from Danganronpa, with a dark fantasy setting influenced by the work of filmmaker Tim Burton, and uses 3D models throughout as opposed to Danganronpa's blend of 3D environments and 2D characters, although still features a similar psycho-pop aesthetic with neon colors. It was developed using the Unreal Engine.

The game was first teased by Too Kyo Games in 2018 with a piece of concept art showing a rainy city and a ghost, and was officially announced in November 2021 as Enigma Archives: Rain Code. It was later retitled Master Detective Archives: Rain Code and released on June 30, 2023, for the Nintendo Switch by Spike Chunsoft. The physical and limited editions of the game include a digital novel prequel, How To Be a Master Detective: A Yakou Furio Case, which was written by Yoichiro Koizumi with supervision by Kodaka. A series of downloadable content consisting of four substories revolving around Yuma's fellow detectives was released monthly between July and October 2023, with chapters available individually or as part of a season pass, which is also included with the digital deluxe edition of the game.

On May 7, 2024, Spike Chunsoft announced that an enhanced version of the game, titled Master Detective Archives: Rain Code +, (Note: Chō Tantei Jikenbo: Rain Code + (超探偵事件簿 レインコード プラス)) was scheduled for release on PlayStation 5, Xbox Series X/S, and Windows via Steam on July 18, 2024, in Japan and on October 1, 2024, worldwide. The game supports resolutions up to 4K and includes all the downloadable content from the Switch version, as well as additional content such as a gallery.

== Reception ==
Reception

Aggregate scores
Aggregator	Score
Metacritic	77/100
OpenCritic	69% recommend

Review scores
Publication	Score
Eurogamer	3/5
Famitsu	8/10, 8/10, 9/10, 8/10
GameSpot	8.1/10
Nintendo Life	7/10
Nintendo World Report	8/10
The Games Machine (Italy)	8.1/10
TouchArcade	4/5
IGN Japan	7/10

Master Detective Archives: Rain Code was the bestselling retail game during its first week of release in Japan, with 55,339 copies being physical. By the end of July, the game had sold over 300,000 copies worldwide.

Master Detective Archives: Rain Code received "generally favorable" reviews from critics, according to the review aggregation website Metacritic. Fellow review aggregator OpenCritic assessed that the game received strong approval, being recommended by 69% of critics.
