= Danganronpa =

Video game series and media franchise

- Genres: Adventure, murder mystery, visual novel
- Developers: Spike; Spike Chunsoft
- Publishers: JP: Spike, Spike Chunsoft; WW: NIS America, Spike Chunsoft; EU: NIS America, Spike Chunsoft, Numskull Games
- Creator: Kazutaka Kodaka
- Artist: Rui Komatsuzaki
- Composer: Masafumi Takada
- Platforms: PlayStation Portable, Android, iOS, PlayStation Vita, Windows, OS X, Linux, PlayStation 4, Nintendo Switch, Xbox One, Nintendo Switch 2
- First release: Danganronpa: Trigger Happy Havoc; 25 November 2010
- Latest release: Danganronpa S: Ultimate Summer Camp; 4 November 2021

Danganronpa (Japanese: ダンガンロンパ; lit. "Bullet Refutation" (Note: Danganronpa is a compound composed of the words dangan (弾丸) "bullet", and ronpa (論破) "refutation".)) is a Japanese video game franchise created by Kazutaka Kodaka and developed and owned by Spike Chunsoft (formerly Spike). The series primarily surrounds various groups of apparent high-school students who are forced into murdering each other by a robotic teddy bear named Monokuma. The gameplay features a mix of adventure, visual novel, detective and dating simulator elements. The first game, Danganronpa: Trigger Happy Havoc, was released for the PlayStation Portable in 2010.

The original scenario was written by Kodaka, who aimed to create a twisted adventure game. The original concept was rejected for being too gruesome, but it was later approved after retooling. The series has morphed into a franchise that includes manga, anime, and novels. The franchise became one of Spike's most successful works since they previously outsourced their works.

The series received many positive reviews from critics, praising the series' characters, tone, and atmosphere. Rui Komatsuzaki's character designs became popular for cosplay. Kodaka's work also inspired staff members from the studio Pierrot in the making of an anime titled Akudama Drive. By 2025, the Danganronpa series reached 10 million copies sold worldwide.

== Premise ==
Release timeline
2010	Danganronpa: Trigger Happy Havoc
2011	Danganronpa Zero
2012	Danganronpa 2: Goodbye Despair
2013	Danganronpa: The Animation
2013	Danganronpa: Kirigiri
2014	Danganronpa Another Episode: Ultra Despair Girls
2015	Danganronpa: Unlimited Battle
2015	Genocider Mode
2015	Danganronpa: Togami
2016	Killer Killer
2016	Danganronpa 3: The End of Hope's Peak High School
2016	Cyber Danganronpa VR: The Class Trial
2016	Kirigiri Sou
2017	Danganronpa V3: Killing Harmony
2018
2019
2020
2021	Danganronpa S: Ultimate Summer Camp
2022
2023
2024
2025
2026
2027	Danganronpa 2x2

The series revolves around an elite high school, Hope's Peak Academy (希望ヶ峰学園, Kibōgamine Gakuen), which, every year, scouts "Ultimate" students (超高校級, chō-kōkō-kyū; lit. Super High School Level), talented high school students who are at the top of their field, along with one "Ultimate Lucky Student" who is chosen by lottery. The three games, Danganronpa: Trigger Happy Havoc (2010), Danganronpa 2: Goodbye Despair (2012), and Danganronpa V3: Killing Harmony (2017) have similar premises. Sixteen talented students who stand out in different fields are trapped by a bear-like machine, Monokuma. The cast is trapped for the rest of their lives in an establishment, and the only way to return home is by killing another person and avoiding being found guilty during the class trials. The video games' narratives are connected by related media, expanding the story between titles.

The first game was ported to iOS and Android in August 2012, with new features such as retina display support, touchscreen controls, and a new image gallery. Two smartphone games, Danganronpa: Monokuma no Gyakushū (ダンガンロンパ モノクマの逆襲; lit. Danganronpa: Monokuma Strikes Back) and Alter Ego (アルターエゴ, Arutāego), were released for Android devices on April 27, 2012, and iOS devices on May 23, 2012. Following the Japanese release of Danganronpa 1-2 Reload, a PlayStation Vita port of the game and its sequel, Danganronpa 2: Goodbye Despair, NIS America released the Vita version of Trigger Happy Havoc in North America and Europe in February 2014. Spike Chunsoft later released the game on Steam in February 2016. NIS America also released Danganronpa 1-2 Reload for PlayStation 4 in North America and Europe in March 2017, and Japan on May 18, 2017. Another compilation for the Nintendo Switch titled Danganronpa Decadence was released in 2021. Besides the trilogy, the compilation offered a new title called Danganronpa S: Ultimate Summer Camp, expanded from the two extra modes of Danganronpa V3.

The spin-off, Danganronpa Another Episode: Ultra Despair Girls, takes place between the events of the first two games, follows series protagonist Makoto Naegi's younger sister, Komaru Naegi, accompanied by Toko Fukawa, as both of them trek through a city overrun by murderous Monokumas, and fighting against a group of children calling themselves the Warriors of Hope. This game was also adapted into the manga Genocider Mode.

=== Gameplay ===
An example of gameplay in Danganronpa. The player is in a Class Trial finding an issue in a character's comment and having to shoot a "Truth Bullet" towards this sentence.

Gameplay in the main Danganronpa games is split into various chapters which each consist of three sections: Daily Life, Deadly Life, and Class Trial. Daily Life follows a standard visual novel style as players explore the school grounds, converse with characters, and progress the story. During designated "Free Time" sections, players can interact with a character of their choice, learning more about them through intimacy events and earning new skills that can help them in the Class Trial. Deadly Life is the post-murder investigation part of the story, in which players search for clues and gather evidence for the Class Trial. The Class Trial is the main section of the series, in which the students attempt to determine the culprit. This involves various types of mini-games, the most common of which is the Nonstop Debate. Here, the characters discuss the case in real-time, and the player must spot contradictions in their statements and shoot them using "Truth Bullets" containing the corresponding evidence. These sections are broken up by assorted minigames including spelling out clues, rhythmically fighting against suspects, and piecing together comic books depicting the case.

The spin-offs Danganronpa Another Episode: Ultra Despair Girls and Danganronpa: Unlimited Battle use different types of gameplay. The former is a third-person shooter in which the protagonist, Komaru Naegi, uses a megaphone to issue commands at most of the electronic objects in-game, including Monokuma Robots and switches. Unlimited Battle is an action game where players use touchscreen controls to fling a team of four of the Danganronpa characters at enemies.

== Development ==
"It was originally a basic visual novel, but visual novel games are not that popular in Japan anymore, either. So we figured that if DanganRonpa were to be just a visual novel, it would not be as popular we wanted it to be, these days. So that's why, to show that the game is really interesting, we decided to add a lot of different features -- after the scenario was written."

— Yoshinori Terasawa

While at Spike, Kodaka proposed an idea to the company that was known as Distrust. The concept was similar to that of Danganronpa, a battle royale style death game in a closed environment between high school students, but the idea was too gruesome and was consequently scrapped. After tweaking the concept, Kodaka successfully pitched it to the company and the game went into production, becoming Danganronpa. The word "Danganronpa" originated from character designer Rui Komatsuzaki which was first written in kanji but it was later taken to katakana for the logo. Kodaka cites David Lynch as a major inspiration when making the games. He stated "As opposed to being about death, these are games about playing for your life, since killing is much less purposeful without a motive to justify it. This is something you can really see with all his titles.".

The first game in the series, titled Danganronpa: Kibō no Gakuen to Zetsubō no Kōkōsei, was produced by Yoshinori Terasawa, who was inspired by movies such as Saw and Cube. The game uses a distinct "pop art" style featuring fluorescent pink blood. The game's scenario was written by Kodaka, with character designs by Rui Komatsuzaki. In February 2014, Kodaka revealed on his Twitter account that the story of Danganronpa was inspired by the Sega Dreamcast game Illbleed, as he loved how "crazy" it was. The game was originally conceived as a basic visual novel but, as visual novels were growing less popular, new gameplay elements were added to make it stand out. Due to budget issues, some lines were not given voice acting which left voice actress Megumi Ogata with the desire to make some important lines in retrospective. She felt a similar feeling with the anime adaptation as she felt it was too trimmed. Kodaka claimed some lines were not befitting to protagonist Makoto Naegi such as when the player is exploring an area. As a result, he also felt they would have added more fitting lines if Spike had the budget for the game.

The game was originally released on PlayStation Portable in Japan on 25 November 2010, and was later ported to iOS and Android devices on 20 August 2012. Prior to the game's release, the company released various promotional material, including a playable demo and trailers, which depicted a different victim from the final game. Two smartphone applications, Danganronpa: Monokuma no Gyakushū (ダンガンロンパ モノクマの逆襲; lit. Danganronpa: Monokuma Strikes Back) and Alter Ego (アルターエゴ, Arutāego), were released for Android devices on 27 April 2012 and iOS devices on 23 May 2012.

After the making of the first Danganronpa game, there were no plans for a sequel. However, the team split up into different groups to make other projects. Initially reluctant, Kodaka was attracted by the idea of creating the novels Danganronpa Zero. Terasawa approached Kodaka with the idea of a sequel in a few months. Kodaka wrote both Zero and Goodbye Despair at the same time. In retrospect, Kodaka considers the novels as needing more structuring work when comparing it with the game. He wrote elements he was doubtful from the first game into the novel as well as more hints towards Goodbye Despair. As a result, Kodaka recommends gamers first read Zero before playing the sequel. The sequel, Danganronpa 2: Goodbye Despair, was released for PSP in Japan on 26 July 2012, featuring various gameplay additions.

On 10 October 2013, Spike Chunsoft released Danganronpa 1・2 Reload (ダンガンロンパ1・2 Reload), a compilation of the first two games, for the PlayStation Vita. Along with higher resolution graphics and touch-screen controls, the compilation added an additional 'School Mode' to the first game, based on the second game's 'Island Mode'. On 6 July 2013, NIS America announced they would be releasing the Vita version of the first game in English under the name Danganronpa: Trigger Happy Havoc, featuring both English and Japanese audio. This version was released in North America on 11 February 2014, and in Europe and Australia on 14 February 2014. The Vita version of the second game, titled Danganronpa 2: Goodbye Despair, was released in North America and Europe in September 2014. Both games were later ported to Steam in 2015 and were released for PlayStation 4 in 2017.

On 9 September 2013, Spike Chunsoft announced a spin-off title of the series, Danganronpa Another Episode: Ultra Despair Girls, which was released on Vita on 25 September 2014 and was released in North America and Europe in September 2015. A free-to-play spin-off game, Danganronpa: Unlimited Battle, was released for iOS in Japan on 7 January 2015. In March 2015, writer Kodaka Kazutaka revealed that Danganronpa 3 was in early development. The game was revealed in September 2015 as Danganronpa V3: Killing Harmony for PlayStation 4 and Vita, which was later released in 2017. A Steam port of Danganronpa V3: Killing Harmony was also in 2017. The game was developed at the same time as the production of the anime series Danganronpa 3: The End of Hope's Peak High School, which Terasawa and Kodaka described as being difficult; they still try to develop both projects without making any compromises, as such an opportunity does not arise often. The "V3" in the game's title was chosen to differentiate it from the anime. Terasawa and Kodaka described the game's production level as being much higher than that of previous games in the series. With Killing Harmony completed, Kodaka claimed that he would take a break from the franchise in a similar fashion to the Back to the Future film series, which consists of three installments.

A free virtual reality technical demo based on the first game, titled Cyber Danganronpa VR: The Class Trial, was released for PlayStation Plus users in Japan for the PlayStation VR on 13 October 2016. A crossover prequel with Otogirisō to the first game, titled Kirigiri Sou, was released for PC users in Japan on 25 November 2016. In 2017, Spike Chunsoft started hiring staff for a new Danganronpa game. In July 2020, it was announced that the franchise's publishing rights outside of Japan will be transferred from NIS America to Spike Chunsoft.

As part of the 10th anniversary celebration, enhanced ports of Danganronpa: Trigger Happy Havoc and Danganronpa 2: Goodbye Despair, titled Danganronpa: Trigger Happy Havoc Anniversary Edition and Danganronpa 2: Goodbye Despair Anniversary Edition respectively, were released on smartphone on November 25, followed by Nintendo Switch in December 2021. Danganronpa: Trigger Happy Havoc Anniversary Edition was also ported to Xbox One and Microsoft Store on January 17. These versions contain a gallery where players can listen to character voices, as well as view character expressions, in-game illustrations, and character references. On Nintendo Switch, the publisher also released an Anniversary Edition of Danganronpa V3: Killing Harmony, as well as Danganronpa S: Ultimate Summer Camp, a brand new exclusive game for the Switch. Danganronpa: Trigger Happy Havoc Anniversary Edition, Danganronpa 2: Goodbye Despair Anniversary Edition, Danganronpa V3: Killing Harmony Anniversary Edition, and Danganronpa S: Ultimate Summer Camp were also collected and sold as a bundle titled Danganronpa Decadence on the Nintendo Switch.

=== Themes ===
According to Kodaka, the first two games focus prominently on the ideas of hope and despair. The cast from the first game suffers the latter theme when being forced to kill each other in Monokuma's battle royale. Kodaka stated that the games were intended "to portray the disparity faced when someone has killed another person while at the same time portraying the hope of one day achieving salvation." Although the game shares traits with Koushun Takami's 1999 novel Battle Royale, Kodaka aimed to provide different ideas when writing the script. Originally, the idea was to use adults as protagonists but he instead found high school characters as more suitable leads due to their immaturity through the usage of character development and how would they react to a killing game. Voice actress Megumi Ogata who voices Makoto Naegi also commented on these themes; Ogata felt Makoto embodies the philosophy of hope as he brings this to the narrative and the setting.

Analyzing these themes further, Ogata said Danganronpa often touches on the conflicting elements of despair and hope. The characters experience despair while they are trapped in the school and Makoto provides more emotional support to the cast across the story, giving the actress a far more optimistic message that the students are going to survive. In Goodbye Despair a new character named Nagito Komaeda was introduced with the same Lucky Talent as Makoto. However, the staff considered them opposites based on their ideals of hope. In contrast to Makoto's heroic ideals of obtaining hope, Nagito instead embraces the idea of despair, believing that from any corrupted work the cast can find salvation. The anime End of Hope's Peak Academy introduces a rival to Makoto named Kyosuke Munakata who shares similar ideals but is corrupted due to his friends' death, and thus contradicts Makoto's ideals. Across the story, Makoto carries the "burdens of hope" in the face of persistent obstacles, allowing him to redeem Kyosuke.

For the third and latest game, Danganronpa V3: Killing Harmony, Kodaka decided to focus on a new theme: lies. Dishonesty is represented through mysteries and surprises the player gets while playing the game. Kodaka claims that games would understand the ideals of lies when presented with the culprits. He was inspired by a mafia-like game where the answers are not provided to the player, and thus wanted Danganronpa to go through this style in terms of writing. This mostly manifested in the new gameplay elements in Killing Harmony as the player can enter hidden routes throughout the class trial by lying at a specific juncture. However, Kodaka had mixed feelings about it, finding that it would come across as forced storytelling. Kodaka also refrained from expanding the theme of romance in the game, as he felt the cast would look weak if this was implemented.

=== Localization ===
The games were localized by NIS America. Due to the poor popularity of outsourced games by the Western studio-like DmC: Devil May Cry or Dead Rising, Spike wanted the Danganronpa to remain true to its Japanese release, with Spike Chunsoft CEO Mitsutoshi Sakurai saying that Western fans seemed to embrace Japanese games like the Final Fantasy series. Due to delays with it being made, fan translations of the first game were present on the internet before NIS America handled the project. Minor changes were made to the characters' names but the team felt that the team aimed the project to be as faithful and accessible to the Western gamers. Spike's single request to NIS America was keeping the Monokuma's names intact. Due to the premise involving mystery, NIS America was keeping clues and at the same making the Class Trials as challenging as the original ones from Japan. While the English cast did not cause difficulties, Toko Fukawa's English voice actress was the most challenging to find as the character has a speech impediment. Monokuma was kept intact to make him look funny and at the same time threatening, something the team enjoyed.

Goodbye Despair was more challenging to localize than the original game due to how much longer the narrative is. The original team tried to work together again on the project to keep themselves familiar with the concepts of the series. In regards to changes NIS America made, Spike Chunsoft was supportive of the ideas they provided. The producer and assistant producers were in direct contact with the original creators of the series, making the interaction between the team to be done quickly. Sonia Nevermind's traits were altered due to how in the Japanese version she was using terms from the 1980s and 1990s in Japan. The team was concerned if her catchphrases should be kept intact for the Western version. Fuyuhiko was also challenging to dub as a result of his initial harsh personality. The casting was made with the help of Bang Zoom!. Similarly, Nagito Komaeda was difficult to dub as a result of his multi-faced personality. Since in the Japanese version both Makoto Naegi and Nagito were voiced by Megumi Ogata, in the English version they decided to also use the same actor: Bryce Papenbrook.

== Other media ==
=== Printed media ===
The first Danganronpa has received two manga adaptations. The first adaptation, illustrated by Saku Toutani, was published in Enterbrain's Famitsu Comic Clear web magazine between June 24, 2011, and October 18, 2013, and is told from the perspective of the other students. The second, illustrated by Samurai Takashi and based on Danganronpa: The Animation, began serialization in Kadokawa Shoten's Shōnen Ace magazine from July 2013. An official fanbook and comic anthologies based on both the game and the anime have also been published. A mini light novel written by Ryohgo Narita, titled Danganronpa IF: The Button of Hope and the Tragic Warriors of Despair (ダンガンロンパIF 希望の脱出装置と絶望の残念無双, Danganronpa IF: Kibō no Dasshutsusōchi to Zetsubō no Zan'nen Musō), is unlockable in Danganronpa 2: Goodbye Despair after clearing the game once. The story takes place in an alternate universe where Makoto manages to find an alleged escape switch.

The prequel, Danganronpa Zero, takes place in Hope's Peak Academy shortly before the events of "The Tragedy", following an anterograde amnesiac protagonist, Ryoko Otonashi, while detective Kyoko Kirigiri searches for its perpetrator, the mysterious Izuru Kamukura. The light novel series Danganronpa: Kirigiri, which takes place before the events of the first game, follows a young Kyoko Kirigiri and her assistant Yui Samidare over the course of several years as they set out to become private detectives, rising through the ranks of the Detective Shelf Collection (探偵図書館, Tantei Toshokan).

Kirigiri Sou, which takes place before the first game and after the events of the light novel series Danganronpa: Kirigiri, follows college student Kouhei Matsudaira and Kyoko Kirigiri, as both of them investigate a mysterious mansion ruled by the influence of a plant hybrid doppelgänger of Kyoko (known as Kyoka) created by Santa Shikiba and her "siblings", the Rhinogradentia.

The light novel trilogy Danganronpa: Togami, which takes place before and during "The Tragedy", follows Byakuya Togami and his secretary and biographer Blue Ink after he is stranded naked in Prague with her by the Ultimate Despair organization, as the Ultimate Imposter takes over the Togami Conglomerate and announces worldwide that lest he (the real Byakuya) be assassinated within the following 24 hours, the Ultimate Despair group will "end the world." The second volume also focuses on a younger Byakuya and the Imposter as they compete against fifteen of their siblings in the Togami family competition for the position of Togami heir, which quickly devolves into a killing game. The manga series Danganronpa Gaiden: Killer Killer, which takes place between the events of the first two games, follows rookie and veteran Future Foundation agents Misaki Asano and Takumi Hijirihara, the latter of whom leads a secret parallel life as a vigilante serial killer obsessed with Mukuro Ikusaba, who only kills other murderers.

A short story booklet titled Danganronpa: Makoto Naegi Secret File – The Worst Day Ever (ダンガンロンパ Makoto Naegi Secret File 苗木誠、人生最悪の日, Naegi Makoto, Jinsei Saiaku no Hi), written by Kazutaka Kodaka, was included with special editions of the first Japanese Blu-ray and DVD release of Danganronpa: The Animation, serving as an origin story relating how Makoto came to be selected as the "Ultimate Lucky Student" of Hope's Peak Academy.

Alongside the next anime, a manga spin-off illustrated by Mitomo Sasako, titled Killer Killer, began serialization in Kodansha's Bessatsu Shōnen Magazine from March 9, 2016. Initially released as Killer Killer, in its third chapter, published on May 9, 2016, the manga series was revealed to be a side-story of Danganronpa 3. The series focuses on Misaki Asano, a young woman assigned to the Future Foundation's sixth branch. She specializes in murder investigations, and is teamed up with fellow investigator Takumi Hijirihara, who, following "The Tragedy", has secretly become a serial killer, known as the "Killer Killer", obsessed with killing other serial killers the pair are tasked with apprehending. Two comic anthologies were released on September 9, 2016, and another was released on October 25, 2016, by Kadokawa Shoten.

=== Anime ===
In December 2012, Kadokawa Shoten's Newtype magazine announced that there would be an anime television series adaptation of the first game, titled Danganronpa: The Animation, produced by Lerche and directed by Seiji Kishi. The series aired between 4 July 2013 and 26 September 2013 on MBS' Anime-ism programming block. The final Blu-ray/DVD volume, released on 26 February 2014, features an extended final episode. Funimation simulcast the series as it aired and released it on Blu-ray/DVD in North America on 10 November 2015, while Manga Entertainment released the series in the UK on 9 November 2015. The anime is licensed by Muse Communication in Southeast Asia and aired on Animax Asia in Japanese audio with English subtitles.

A second anime series, titled Danganronpa 3: The End of Hope's Peak High School, aired between July and September 2016. The series is split into two simultaneously airing parts: Side: Future, which serves as a conclusion to the "Hope's Peak Academy" storyline, and Side: Despair, which serves as a prequel to the first two games, Trigger Happy Havoc and Goodbye Despair. Seiji Kishi once again directed the series at Lerche, while Norimitsu Kaihō wrote the screenplay. The Danganronpa development staff have stated that, while difficult to work on both titles simultaneously, they are giving it since the opportunity to do something like it does not come up often. Initially, an anime adaptation of Danganronpa 2 had been planned, but in the end the development staff opted for making an anime that takes place after Danganronpa 2 instead, as Kodaka felt that the Danganronpa 2 characters' story had ended within that game and that he could not write another about what happened to them afterward very easily. While class trials had originally been considered, it was thought that it would have been too painful for the characters to sit through another one, which was what led to the decision to make the conclusion into an anime.

The series was licensed for simulcasting by Funimation. Despite episodes alternating between the Future and Despair arcs when it originally aired, Funimation groups the episodes by arc on its streaming service. An original video animation titled Super Danganronpa 2.5: Komaeda Nagito to Sekai no Hakaisha, was bundled with Danganronpa V3 in Japan on 12 January 2017.

=== Music ===
The original soundtracks for both the games and the anime are composed by Masafumi Takada. The soundtrack for Danganronpa: Trigger Happy Havoc was released in Japan by Sound Prestige Records on 14 February 2011, with the ending theme, "Playback -rebuild-" (再生 -rebuild-, Saisei -rebuild-), performed by Megumi Ogata, which is also used as the anime's final ending theme. The soundtrack for Danganronpa 2: Goodbye Despair was released on 31 August 2012. The soundtrack for Danganronpa: The Animation was released by Geneon Universal Entertainment on 28 August 2013. The opening theme for the anime series was "Never Say Never", performed by TKDz2b with Jas Mace, Marchitect and Tribeca, the single of which was included with the first Blu-ray/DVD volume of the anime released on 28 August 2013. The ending theme is "Despairity: A Hero's Treatment" (絶望性：ヒーロー治療薬, Zetsubōsei: Hero Chiryōyaku) by Susumu feat. Soraru, the single of which was released on 4 September 2013. There have also been drama CDs, as well as bonus soundtracks included with limited-edition releases of the games.

=== Appearances in other games ===
Monokuma appears in some downloadable content for Spike Chunsoft's role-playing game, Conception II: Children of the Seven Stars. Costumes of Monokuma and Monomi also appear in the Japanese PlayStation 3 and PlayStation Vita versions of Terraria, which are published by Spike Chunsoft in that region. Another Spike game developed for the PlayStation Portable, Gachitora: The Roughneck Teacher in High School, allows a player to wear a Monokuma costume if a Danganronpa save file is present upon playing Gachitora. Downloadable outfits based on Monokuma and Monomi also appeared in the Super Sonico game, Motto! SoniComi. Characters from Danganronpa appear as downloadable content in Fushigi no Chronicle: Furikaerimasen Katsu Madewa. The roguelike rhythm game Crypt of the Necrodancer features remixed music from the Danganronpa series, as well as character skins of Makoto Naegi, Monokuma, Monomi, Hajime Hinata, Junko Enoshima, Chiaki Nanami, Ibuki Mioda and Sayaka Maizono. Costumes of Makoto, Kyoko, Junko, Monokuma, Hajime, Chiaki, Nagito and Mikan, as well as a pet of Monomi appear as part of a crossover in the NetEase survival mobile game Identity V.

=== Theatrical plays ===
The franchise had a theatrical play dubbed Danganronpa The Stage 2016 (ダンガンロンパ THE STAGE 2016). The play follows Makoto Naegi as he and his classmates must kill each other without being caught by the other students. The play features all the characters from the anime and game. The game is localized to Japan only. A stage play based on the anime Future Arc was made with InnocentSphere's Hideyuki Nishimori directing and writing the scripts. It premiered on 20 July 2018.

== Reception ==
Japanese and Western review scores As of 1 May 2024.
Game	Famitsu	Metacritic
Danganronpa: Trigger Happy Havoc	(PSP) 36/40	(PC) 82/100 (Vita) 80/100
Danganronpa 2: Goodbye Despair	(PSP) 37/40	(PC) 83/100 (Vita) 81/100
Danganronpa Another Episode: Ultra Despair Girls	(Vita) 35/40	(Vita) 72/100 (PS4) 67/100
Danganronpa V3: Killing Harmony	(PS4) 37/40 (Vita) 37/40	(PS4) 81/100 (Vita) 80/100 (PC) 80/100
Danganronpa 1-2 Reload		(PS4) 83/100
Danganronpa S: Ultimate Summer Camp		(NS) 54/100

=== Sales ===
The series was a commercial success. As of 7 November 2018, the game series had sold over of 930,000 units in Japan. The best-selling Danganronpa game in Japan is Danganronpa: Trigger Happy Havoc, which sold a total of 258,250 units on the PlayStation Portable. In Europe and the United States, combined sales of the first two games on PlayStation Vita, Trigger Happy Havoc and Goodbye Despair, have surpassed 200,000 copies sold as of April 2015. Spike Chunsoft reported in March 2018 that the two games each sold an additional 200,000 units through Steam. By 2025, the series reached 10 million copies sold worldwide.

=== Critical response ===
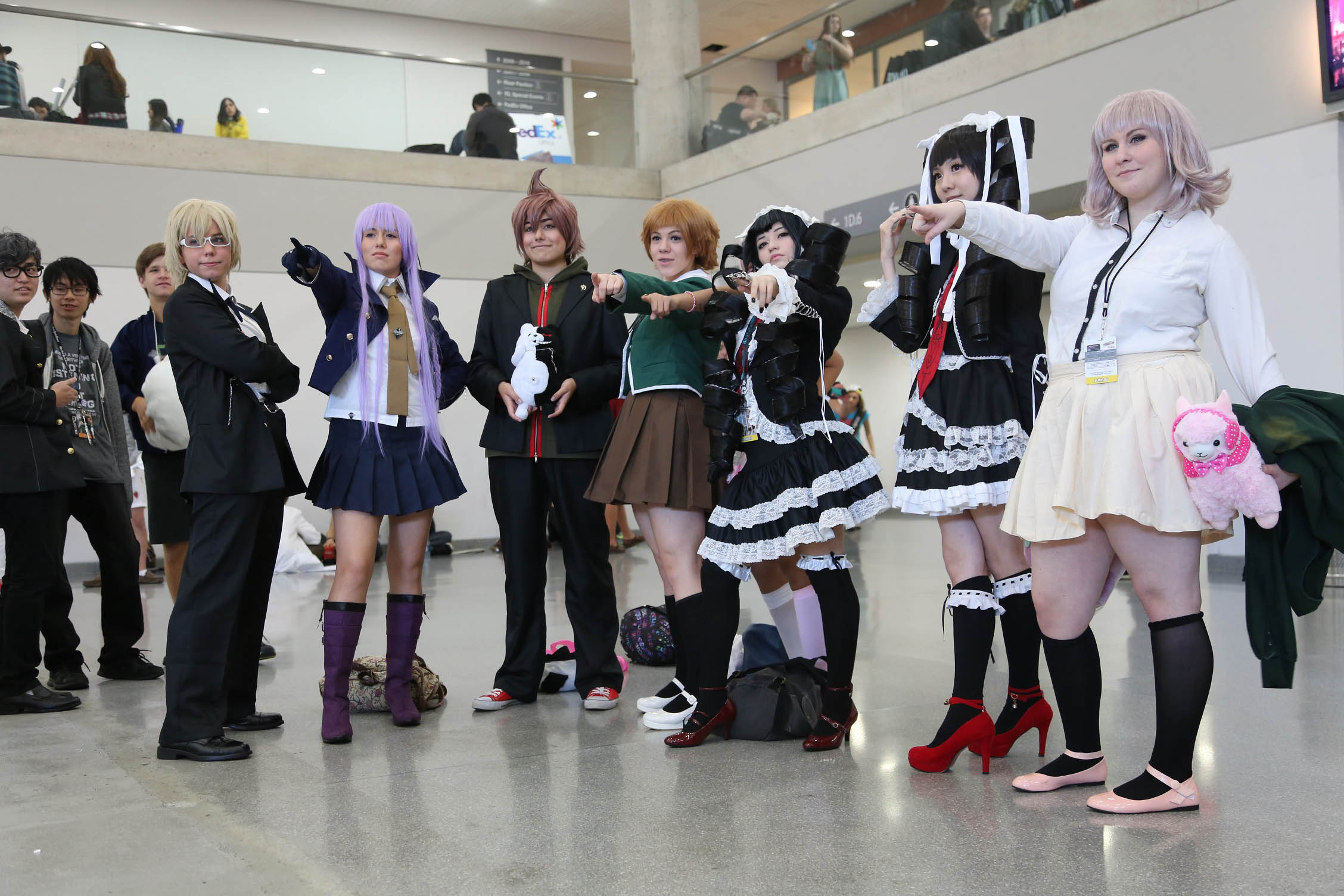
Cosplay of the series has been popular due to the characters' distinctive traits.

USGamer claimed that the popularity behind Danganronpa not only comes from the plot and gameplay but also the "zany, multifaceted characters" who are both expressive and distinctive. The tension provoked by the trials was said to be the most important part of the gameplay, as the player feels confused about what character could have been the murderer of a case. Hardcore Gamer said the game has an "uncanny ability to leave its players slack-jawed at the sights of the unraveling plot points." Destructoid praised its art style and well thought out story. The media focused on the art style and character designs, which they felt helped to easily tell apart characters and enjoy their interactions with leads. A major praise in regards to the narrative are the twists revealed through class trial like Nagito Komaeda's true character in Goodbye Despair or Kaede Akamatsu's last action in Killing Harmony. This also led to articles focused on the game's strongest characters based on intelligence or major role in the series. However, the trials have often received criticism for being easy to solve. The latest game, Killing Harmony, attracted divisive comments from fans due to its ending which involves the characters being aware of their fictional nature and the emotional catharisis they have suffered as a result of the series' popularity.

The cast in general was well received with several of them often being the subject of cosplay based on their distinctive designs, with multiple favoriting Junko Enoshima and series' mascot Monokuma. In November 2019, a Monokuma costume created controversy in Austin, Texas, after drag queen Erika Klash was denied entry to a Whataburger while dressed as the character, after performing in-character at the Austin International Drag Festival at the club Elysium for five years. Klash later received an apology from a Whataburger representative over the incident, both in-person and on Twitter. The reveal in the first game of one characters' gender, who had been cross-dressing, received mixed reception from some critics, who called the discovery "a cheap plot device".

The series has won multiple awards, including the first one: GameFan as Game of the Year, Best Sony Portable Exclusive Game, and Best Adventure Game. Game Informer awarded it Best Vita Exclusive, Best New Character (Monokuma) while RPGFan gave it the "Best Story", and "Best Graphic Adventure", while Goodbye Despair received Famitsu's Game of the Year (Readers), Hardcore Gamer's Best PS Vita Game, "Best New Character" (Monokuma), and "Best Adventure Game", while in the Japan Game Awards it won the "Award of Excellence". In 2017, Famitsu readers voted Danganronpa among the top four adventure games of all time, along with Steins;Gate, 428: Shibuya Scramble and Phoenix Wright: Ace Attorney. Killing Harmony won the Excellence Prize at the Famitsu Awards and the award for "Best Plot Twist" in Game Informer's 2017 Adventure Game of the Year Awards. In a Famitsu poll celebrating the franchise's tenth anniversary, the series remained more popular within female players than male players. The survey also included the fact that Danganronpa is mostly popular within young adults despite the magazine claiming the game were created to appeal to older gamers.

In 2014, The 19th Animation Kobe committee chose Seiji Kishi to receive their Individual Award for the stretch of his career including Danganronpa: The Animation, Arpeggio of Blue Steel, and Hamatora. GamesRadar writer Kenneth Shepard acclaimed the End of Hope's Peak Academy series, stating that despite the franchise changing media from games, the narrative was appropriate for the television series. He added that he felt that the anime managed to bring closure to Makoto's story arc and felt his story easy for newcomers rather than just returning players. The finale of the series' Hope Arc earned positive reception for how it handled the respective finales of Makoto's and Hajime's/Izuru's journeys, despite lacking the appeal the original games had in the usage of antagonists.

According to Kodaka, Ace Attorney's success in North America was due to how it distinguished itself from most visual novels with its gameplay mechanics, which Danganronpa later built upon and helped it also find success in North America. He further noted that the team behind the games were surprised by the popularity of the three games, claiming they were not expecting Danganronpa to become popular games. As a result, he found that the franchise was so successful that it approached Atlus's role-playing game series Persona, although Persona still being vastly more popular. Anime director Tomohisa Taguchi was so impressed by Kodaka's work on Danganronpa that he collaborated with him on the anime Akudama Drive.
