= Danganronpa 2×2 =

Upcoming 2027 video game

- Developer: Gemdrops
- Publisher: Spike Chunsoft
- Director: Takahiro Suzuki
- Producer: Shohei Sakakibara
- Artist: Rui Komatsuzaki
- Writer: Yoichiro Koizumi
- Composers: Masafumi Takada; Jun Fukuda
- Series: Danganronpa
- Engine: Unreal Engine 5
- Platforms: Nintendo Switch; Nintendo Switch 2; PlayStation 5; Windows; Xbox Series X/S
- Release: January 14, 2027
- Genres: Adventure, visual novel
- Mode: Single-player

Danganronpa 2×2 (Note: Known in Japan as Super Danganronpa 2×2 (Japanese: スーパーダンガンロンパ2×2, Hepburn: Sūpā Danganronpa Tsū Bai Tsū)) (pronounced "two by two") is an upcoming visual novel adventure game developed by Gemdrops with contributions from Too Kyo Games and published by Spike Chunsoft. It is set for release for Nintendo Switch, Nintendo Switch 2, PlayStation 5, Windows, and Xbox Series X/S on January 14, 2027.

Danganronpa 2×2 features two main parts: an Original Mode, a remake of the 2012 game Danganronpa 2: Goodbye Despair, as well as the new Slayhem Mode, featuring the same cast of characters in a new storyline with different culprits and victims. The latter was written by Yoichiro Koizumi, based on the concept by Takekuni Kitayama and series creator Kazutaka Kodaka, and offers approximately 20% more content than Original Mode.

== Synopsis ==
Danganronpa 2×2 reimagines the characters and setting of the original Danganronpa 2: Goodbye Despair within the context of an alternate narrative. Sixteen uniquely talented students, known as "Ultimates", are gathered on a tropical island for a school trip which is hijacked by series antagonist Monokuma. In order to escape, they are forced to commit murder while avoiding suspicion from their peers in Class Trials; if they succeed, they are allowed to leave while the other students are executed; if the culprit is caught, they alone are executed.

=== Slayhem Mode ===
In "Slayhem Mode", an alternative story occurs in which Monokuma provides the students with items such as "Slayhem" weapons as an incentive to kill each other. Sakutaro Higashi, a character who did not appear in the original Danganronpa 2, appears in Slayhem Mode and is voiced by Natsuki Hanae in Japanese and Griffin Burns in English.

== Development and release ==
Danganronpa 2×2's scenario is written by Yoichiro Koizumi, under supervision by series creator Kazutaka Kodaka. Other returning staff from the original include character designer Rui Komatsuzaki and composers Masafumi Takada and Jun Fukuda. The game was originally titled "Danganronpa 2: Take 2" during development, before being changed to the final title due to internal feedback.

As part of the franchise's 15th anniversary, the game was revealed on September 12, 2025, during a Nintendo Direct presentation. It was scheduled for release in 2026, but was delayed to January 14, 2027; it will release on Nintendo Switch, Nintendo Switch 2, PlayStation 5, Windows, and Xbox Series X/S.

Danganronpa 2×2 has been referred to as a remake by Kotaku, Siliconera and Gamereactor. Kodaka described the game as not being a remake, but a "retelling" of the Danganronpa 2 story. Producer Shohei Sakakibara explained that the new story of Danganronpa 2×2 and the "remake" portion share the same introduction, but an early event separates them into two independent narratives.

A release date trailer for the game was revealed in a September 9 Nintendo Direct, which confirmed the game's release date as January 14, 2027. Prior to the Nintendo Direct, the alleged existence and design of a character original to 2×2, later revealed to be Sakutaro Higashi, had been leaked. The September 9 trailer officially confirmed the existence of Higashi, although it did not reveal anything about their identity or story role. Prior to his reveal, Higashi was widely nicknamed "John Danganronpa" by fans, to the point that Spike Chunsoft acknowledged it in their social media posts.
