= Culprit =

English legal term

A culprit, under English law properly the prisoner at the bar, is one accused of a crime. The term is used, generally, of one guilty of an offence. In origin the word is a combination of two Anglo-French legal words: "culpable" (guilty), and "prit" or "prest" (Old French: ready). On the prisoner at the bar pleading not guilty, the clerk of the crown answered culpable, and states that he was ready ("prest") to join issue. The words "cul. prist" were then entered on the roll, showing that issue had been joined. When French law terms were discontinued, the words were taken as forming one word addressed to the prisoner.

The formula "Culprit, how will you be tried?" in answer to a plea of "not guilty," is first found in the trial for murder of the 7th Earl of Pembroke in 1678.

Under current criminal law, the preferred term is defendant.
