= Kazutaka Kodaka =

Japanese video game designer and writer

- 小高 和剛
- Born: July 8, 1978 (age 48); Japan
- Education: Nihon University
- Occupations: Video game director, writer
- Employers: Spike (2007–2012); Spike Chunsoft (2012–2017); Too Kyo Games (2017–present)
- Known for: Danganronpa series

Kazutaka Kodaka (Japanese: 小高 和剛, Hepburn: Kodaka Kazutaka; born July 8, 1978) is a Japanese video game designer, writer, and manga artist. His work is known for recurring themes of contrasting hope and despair, luck and talent, truth and lies, and mixing tragedy with dark humor, as well as using numerous plot twists. He was an employee of Spike Chunsoft (formerly Spike) and is widely known as the creator and writer of the Danganronpa franchise. He left the company in 2017 and founded Too Kyo Games with other ex-employees.

== Biography ==
=== Early life ===
Kodaka was born at July 8, 1978, and has lived in Tokyo his entire life. He was educated at a private boys' junior high school. He described his childhood saying that he had very few friends and spent his free time after school watching anime, though he would have wanted to be popular among his peers. Still, he studied diligently as it was the only way he could get results, but eventually he grew tired and only regained his enthusiasm when he became aware of a chance to study film at Nihon University College of Art, where he later majored and graduated, earning a degree in film studies.

The first video games Kodaka played were Wrecking Crew, Clu Clu Land, and Pac-Man. He enjoyed playing games a lot, holding a part-time job at a video game store while studying at university. His original career plan was to become a film screenwriter, but later went for a different industry: Kodaka had a strong desire to "make something original", and felt it would be easier to do so as video games instead of movies. He applied for jobs at both Atlus and Spike. At the time, Atlus had a bigger lineup of games with stories, so Kodaka pursued Spike, as he thought he would have a better chance at making an original game there.

=== Career ===
==== Spike / Spike Chunsoft ====
While at Spike, Kodaka had an idea for a detective game; so he proposed an idea to the company that was known as Distrust. The concept was similar to that of Danganronpa, a battle royale style death game in a closed environment between high school students, but the idea was too gruesome and was consequently scrapped. After tweaking the concept, Kodaka successfully pitched it to the company and the game went into production, becoming Danganronpa.

Danganronpa: Trigger Happy Havoc released for PlayStation Portable on November 25, 2010. Selling 25,564 copies within the first week. The game hit 85,000 sold copies roughly three months after the release, which was enough for the CEO of Spike Chunsoft to call it a success. In the light of the success, the game received two sequels (Danganronpa 2: Goodbye Despair, Danganronpa V3: Killing Harmony), a side story shooter game (Danganronpa Another Episode: Ultra Despair Girls), an anime adaptation (Danganronpa: The Animation) and various novels and manga. Kodaka left the company in 2017.

==== Too Kyo Games ====
After having left Spike Chunsoft, Kodaka and other six developers who had left the company simultaneously founded Too Kyo Games. The company's goal, according to Kodaka, was to create new intellectual properties and for the staff to make their own indie games. Also by the words of Kodaka, the company is for them as much a club activity as a business. He also mentioned that he would still like to go back to the Danganronpa franchise at some point in the future. Death Come True, the first game released by Too Kyo Games in June 2020, is written and directed by Kodaka. In November 2021, Master Detective Archives: Rain Code was announced as a collaboration with Spike Chunsoft, with Kodaka writing alongside Takekuni Kitayama.

== Creative philosophy and influences ==
=== Philosophy ===
External video
- Kazutaka Kodaka, writing Danganronpa on YouTube from Archipel with English subtitles

By his own words, Kodaka centralizes on writing characters, and he has stated that he cannot write characters whom he does not like. As a result, he does not begin the process of creating a story by thinking of characters first, as he feels doing so would restrict him, but instead first crafts a compelling scenario, on top of which he can build characters. Kodaka operates under the belief that a game requires more investment from the audience and therefore the scenario is the key to hook them. His desire is to create stories people find fresh, although he has noted that he sees a structure in his works and he admires writers whose stories go against structure. He also keeps in mind why the story is being written and gives the story a meaning. A display of that is the apparent statement by Kodaka that everything he has ever wanted to tell can be found inside Danganronpa.

Stories Kodaka writes often revolve around acts of human monstrosities, primarily murder. Further, he says he finds the lightness of killing in a story something that he likes and compares it to a black joke taken to the extreme. Kodaka's characters tend to have amnesia as it allows them to easily connect with the player.

=== Influences ===
Kodaka's works feature many references which signifies the influence of other authors on his creative process. Furthermore, Kodaka has specified on how he refreshes his mind when he is stuck with his writing, saying he does it by watching movies, anime, and reading manga, while paying attention to what interests him in those stories. Kodaka named David Lynch, Quentin Tarantino, and the Coen brothers as his primary influences. Another big influence on Kodaka is Kunihiko Ikuhara, whose writing Kodaka admires. Kodaka is also a fan of Goichi Suda's games, and told in an interview with Suda that they inspired him and his colleagues. He included one of Suda's games, Twilight Syndrome, in Danganronpa 2 as a homage.

== Works ==
=== Video games ===
Year	Title	Role	Ref.
2002	Clock Tower 3	Assistant director	
2007	Dragon Ball Z: Budokai Tenkaichi 3	Designer	
2008	Jake Hunter	Writer	
2008	Bakusou Dekotora Legend Black	Writer	
2009	Detective Conan & The Kindaichi Case Files	Writer	
2009	Dragon Ball: Raging Blast	Designer	
2010	Danganronpa: Trigger Happy Havoc	Designer, writer	
2012	Danganronpa 2: Goodbye Despair	Writer	
2014	Danganronpa Another Episode: Ultra Despair Girls	Director, writer	
2015	School of Ragnarok	Writer	
2016	Kirigiri Sou	Producer	
2017	Danganronpa V3: Killing Harmony	Original concept, designer, writer	
2020	Death Come True	Director, writer	
2020	World's End Club	Creative director	
2023	Master Detective Archives: Rain Code	Original concept, designer, writer	
2025	Tribe Nine	Original concept	
2025	The Hundred Line: Last Defense Academy	Director, writer, original concept, designer	
2025	Shuten Order	Story	
2027	Danganronpa 2x2	Original concept, supervisor	

=== Literature ===
Year	Title	Ref.
2006	Detective Saburō Jingūji: The Ghost of Shinjuku	
2007	Detective Saburō Jingūji: Shining Mirai	
2011	Danganronpa Zero	
2013	Danganronpa: Makoto Naegi Secret File - The Worst Day Ever	
2013	Guren 5	
2016	Danganronpa Gaiden: Killer Killer	
2017	Danganronpa Kodaka ～ 890 days for "Danganronpa"	
2018	Gambler's Parade	

=== Anime ===
Year	Title	Role	Ref.
2013	Danganronpa: The Animation	Writer supervision	
2015	Wooser's Hand-to-Mouth Life	Script (Episode 11)	
2016	Danganronpa 3: The End of Hope's Peak High School	Original concept, writer supervision	
2020	Akudama Drive	Original story	
2022	Tribe Nine	Original concept	
