= Rui Komatsuzaki =

Japanese character artist

Rui Komatsuzaki (Japanese: 小松崎 類, Hepburn: Komatsuzaki Rui) is a Japanese illustrator and character designer. He is best known for designing and characterizing the cast members from the visual novel adventure game series Danganronpa and the anime series Akudama Drive.

== Career ==
Komatsuzaki was a sculpture graduate before becoming involved with Spike, and Danganronpa was his first experience as a character designer. The word Danganronpa originated from Komatsuzaki, which was first written in kanji but was later changed to katakana for the logo.

For most games, he was in charge of designing characters with outstanding designs while the protagonist were meant to look like common people. As a result, Komatsuzaki designed Makoto Naegi to wear a hoodie to complement his look, thinking the player was going to see his back a lot. After that, he added some character to his hair by adding an "antenna", and highlighted his "herbivore nature" by making him short. His coloring is subdued, but Komatsuzaki used a color palette he enjoyed. He also redesigned the older cast members from the first Danganronpa for the anime sequel Danganronpa 3: The End of Hope's Peak High School to make them look more mature, and illustrated the characters for the spin-off novel series Zero, Kirigiri, and Togami.

Besides Danganronpa, Komatsuzaki was one of many artists to design characters for Fate/Grand Order, an RPG mobile game based on the Fate/stay night series. He designed both Edmond Dantès and Cleopatra. He was also the main artist for the anime series Akudama Drive from 2020. Cindy H. Yamauchi adapted Rui Komatsuzaki's original character designs for animation. He also created a collaboration illustration between Danganronpa and the anime Akudama Drive in late 2020.

== Works ==
=== Video games ===
Year	Title	Role	Ref.
2006	Dragon Ball Z: Budokai Tenkaichi 2	Background art	
2007	Dragon Ball Z: Budokai Tenkaichi 3	Background art	
2009	Dragon Ball: Raging Blast	Interface design	
2010	Danganronpa: Trigger Happy Havoc	Character design	
2012	Danganronpa 2: Goodbye Despair	Character design	
2014	Danganronpa Another Episode: Ultra Despair Girls	Character design	
2017	Danganronpa V3: Killing Harmony	Character design	
2020	Death Come True	Promo art	
2023	Master Detective Archives: Rain Code	Character design	
2025	Tribe Nine	Character design	
2025	The Hundred Line: Last Defense Academy	Character design	
2027	Danganronpa 2×2	Character design	

=== Anime ===
Year	Title	Role	Ref.
2016	Danganronpa 3: The End of Hope's Peak High School	Character designer	
2020	Akudama Drive	Character designer	
2022	Tribe Nine	Character designer	
