= Danganronpa: The Animation =

Japanese anime television series

- Cover art featuring the students of Hope's Peak Academy and the main antagonist, Monokuma

ダンガンロンパ The Animation
- Genre: Murder mystery
- Anime television series
- Directed by: Seiji Kishi
- Written by: Makoto Uezu
- Music by: Masafumi Takada
- Studio: Lerche
- Licensed by: Crunchyroll (Note: Previously known as Funimation, which distributes the series in North America, while Madman Anime handles distribution in Australia and Crunchyroll UK and Ireland (formerly Manga Entertainment) in the United Kingdom.); SA/SEA: Muse Communication
- Original network: MBS, TBS, CBC, BS-TBS
- English network: SEA: Animax Asia
- Original run: 4 July 2013 – 26 September 2013
- Episodes: 13
- Light novel
- Written by: Ryo Kawakami
- Illustrated by: Takashi Tsukimi
- Published by: Kadokawa Shoten
- Original run: 20 September 2013 – 20 December 2013
- Volumes: 2
- icon

Danganronpa: The Animation (Note: Known in Japan as Danganronpa: Kibō no Gakuen to Zetsubō no Kōkōsei The Animation (Japanese: ダンガンロンパ 希望の学園と絶望の高校生 The Animation; lit. 'Danganronpa: The Academy of Hope and the High School Students of Despair The Animation')) is an anime television series produced by Lerche, based on Spike Chunsoft's 2010 visual novel Danganronpa: Trigger Happy Havoc. The thirteen episode adaptation aired on MBS' Animeism programming block between July and September 2013. The series is licensed by Crunchyroll in the English-speaking regions of North America, Australia and United Kingdom and Muse Communication in Asia-Pacific. The series was succeeded by an anime-original sequel to the game series, Danganronpa 3: The End of Hope's Peak High School, which aired in 2016.

== Plot ==
Danganronpa: The Animation follows the events of the video game Danganronpa: Trigger Happy Havoc. The series follows 16 high school students locked inside "Hope's Peak Academy," their high school. The students are threatened by an anthropomorphic bear, Monokuma, who gives them only one way to leave the Academy: to murder another student, and not be found guilty in the subsequent trial.

== Characters ==
The anime follows protagonist Makoto Naegi (苗木 誠, Naegi Makoto) and fifteen other students. Each character has an "ultimate" skill, or profession; such as the "Ultimate Gambler", or "Ultimate Swimmer". When dubbed from Japan they are usually called "Super High School Level."

== Release ==
In December 2012, Kadokawa Shoten's Newtype magazine announced that there would be an anime television series adaptation of the game, titled Danganronpa: The Animation, produced by Lerche, directed by Seiji Kishi, and written by Makoto Uezu. The final Blu-ray/DVD volume, released on 26 February 2014, contains an extended final episode. The series aired in Japan on MBS' Animeism programming block between 4 July 2013 and 26 September 2013. The series is licensed in North America by Funimation, who simulcast it as it aired and released the series on BD/DVD on 10 November 2015. Funimation's English dub contains almost a completely different cast from that of the games, with only Bryce Papenbrook reprising his role as Makoto Naegi. Manga Entertainment released the series in the United Kingdom on 9 November 2015.

The opening theme is "Never Say Never" by TKDz2b with rapping provided by Jas Mace and Marchitect (aka The 49ers) and Tribeca, whilst the ending theme is "Zetsubōsei: Hero Chiryōyaku" (絶望性：ヒーロー治療薬, Despairity: A Hero's Treatment) by Suzumu feat. Soraru. The opening theme for episode one is "Danganronpa" by Masafumi Takada whilst the opening theme for episode four is "Monokuma Ondo" (モノクマおんど) by Sachiko Kobayashi feat. Monokuma (Nobuyo Ōyama). The ending theme for episode 13 is "Saisei -rebuild-" (再生 -rebuild-, Playback -rebuild-) by Makoto Naegi (Megumi Ogata).

The soundtrack was released on 28 August 2013 by Geneon Universal (now NBCUniversal Entertainment Japan), one of the anime's production companies.

A two-volume light novel adaptation written by Ryo Kawakami and illustrated by Takashi Tsukimi was released in 2013.

In 2014, The 19th Animation Kobe committee chose Kishi to receive their Individual Award for the stretch of his career including Danganronpa: The Animation, Arpeggio of Blue Steel, and Hamatora.

== Sequel ==
A second anime series, titled Danganronpa 3: The End of Hope's Peak High School, aired between July and September 2016. The series concludes the "Hope's Peak Academy" storyline and is split into two parts; Future Side which takes place after Danganronpa 2: Goodbye Despair, and Despair Side, which takes place prior to the events of Trigger Happy Havoc. Seiji Kishi once again directed the series at Lerche, while Norimitsu Kaihō wrote the screenplay.
