= Mystery Chronicle: One Way Heroics =

2015 video game

- English cover art
- Developer: Spike Chunsoft
- Publisher: Spike Chunsoft
- Director: Kazuhiko Ogawa
- Producer: Yusuke Katagata
- Artist: Mogeo Fuji
- Writer: Nobuyasu Motoki
- Composer: Katsumi Yokokawa
- Series: Mystery Dungeon
- Platforms: PlayStation 4, PlayStation Vita, Microsoft Windows
- Release: PlayStation 4, PS Vita: JP: July 30, 2015; NA: September 13, 2016; EU: September 13, 2016; Microsoft Windows: WW: September 13, 2016
- Genre: Role-playing
- Modes: Single-player, multiplayer

Mystery Chronicle: One Way Heroics (Note: Known in Japan as Fushigi no Chronicle: Furikaerimasen Katsu Madewa (Japanese: 不思議のクロニクル 振リ返リマセン勝ツマデハ; lit. "Mystery Chronicle: I Won't Look Back Until I Win").) is a role-playing video game developed by Spike Chunsoft for the PlayStation 4 and PlayStation Vita, released in Japan on July 30, 2015. It is a spin-off of the Mystery Dungeon series, and is based on the indie game One Way Heroics.

== Gameplay ==
Like previous Mystery Dungeon titles, Fushigi no Chronicle is a turn-based role-playing game in which players explore randomly-generated dungeons, but with every turn that passes, the screen will scroll as the game world slowly gets swallowed up by a light.

== Development ==
The game's producers, Yuichiro Saito and Yoshinori Terasawa, found out about the game One Way Heroics at the Japanese indie game developer gathering BitSummit; they were intrigued by the idea of combining roguelike gameplay with forced scrolling, and found the game fun to play. At first they considered porting the game to consoles, but as the original version of the game was available to play for free, they instead thought of ways to expand and improve on it; eventually they asked the developer of One Way Heroics for permission to develop a new game from scratch, with One Way Heroics as the foundation.

The game was released for PlayStation 4 and PlayStation Vita by Spike Chunsoft on July 30, 2015, in Japan. To promote it, character classes based on the Spike Chunsoft game series Danganronpa and Shiren the Wanderer were included in the game.

Limited Run Games released physical editions of the PlayStation 4 and PlayStation Vita versions in the West in September 2016, limited to 5,000 copies for each of the platforms.

== Reception ==
Reception

Aggregate score
Aggregator	Score
Metacritic	68/100

Review score
Publication	Score
Famitsu	30/40 (7, 8, 8, 7)

The game was met by "mixed or average" reviews according to the review aggregator Metacritic.
