= Danganronpa V3: Killing Harmony =

2017 visual novel

- Cover art featuring Monokuma (upper left) and the students of Ultimate Academy
- Developer: Spike Chunsoft
- Publisher: Spike Chunsoft (Note: PlayStation 4 and PlayStation Vita versions originally published by NIS America outside of Japan)
- Director: Shun Sasaki
- Producer: Yoshinori Terasawa
- Programmer: Kengo Ito
- Artist: Rui Komatsuzaki
- Writers: Kazutaka Kodaka; Takayuki Sugawara
- Composer: Masafumi Takada
- Series: Danganronpa
- Engine: Spike Framework ("Original") Unity (Anniversary)
- Platforms: PlayStation 4; PlayStation Vita; Windows; Nintendo Switch; Android; iOS; Xbox One
- Release: PlayStation 4, PS Vita: JP: January 12, 2017; NA: September 26, 2017; EU: September 29, 2017; AU: October 6, 2017; Windows: WW: September 26, 2017; Anniversary Edition: WW: September 15, 2022; Nintendo Switch: JP: November 4, 2021; WW: December 3, 2021; Android, iOS: WW: April 11, 2022; Xbox One: WW: September 15, 2022
- Genres: Adventure, visual novel
- Mode: Single-player

Danganronpa V3: Killing Harmony (Note: Known in Japan as New Danganronpa V3: Minna no Koroshiai Shingakki (Japanese: ニューダンガンロンパV3 みんなのコロシアイ新学期, Hepburn: Nyū Danganronpa V3: Minna no Koroshiai Shingakki; lit. 'New Danganronpa V3: Everyone's New Semester of Mutual Killing')) is a visual novel developed and published by Spike Chunsoft. It was released in Japan in January 2017 for PlayStation 4 and PlayStation Vita, and in North America and Europe by NIS America in September 2017. A Windows version was released worldwide on the same date. An enhanced version of V3 with the subtitle Anniversary Edition was released for Nintendo Switch in Japan in November 2021, and worldwide in December 2021. This improved version was also released for Android and iOS in April 2022, and for Windows 10 and Xbox One in September 2022.

The game is the third numbered Danganronpa video game and a reboot of the series set in a new continuity where-in the previous entries exist as fiction. It was written by Kazutaka Kodaka and Takayuki Sugawara. The game primarily follows Kaede Akamatsu, Shuichi Saihara, and fourteen other high school students with special talents, called "ultimates". The students are trapped in a killing game where they are forced to murder for a chance to graduate and survive, but if they are voted out and suspected by the majority of students they will be executed. The player interacts with the other characters in the form of dating sim–like events. When a murder occurs, the player collects evidence and testimonies before participating in a class trial to uncover the killer. These trials feature a mix of logic puzzles and action minigames. Danganronpa V3: Killing Harmony was a commercial success and was generally well received by critics, who praised the scenario and gameplay. However, the ending of the game was divisive and caused controversy amongst critics.

== Gameplay ==
Danganronpa V3 continues the same style of gameplay as the first two numbered Danganronpa games, which is split into School Life, Deadly Life, and Class Trial segments. During School Life, the player interacts with other characters and progresses through the story until coming across a murder victim and entering the Deadly Life, during which they must gather evidence for use in the Class Trial. Roaming around the world and interacting with objects during both School Life and Deadly Life will yield experience points for the player. Experience points are used to level up and with each level the player obtains more skill points which enable them to equip skills to help with Class Trials. Like in previous games, Class Trials largely revolve around the Non-Stop Debate, in which characters discuss the case, with the player required to use Truth Bullets containing evidence against highlighted statements determining whether a character is wrong, lying, or telling the truth. During Non-Stop debates that appear to have no clear contradictions, there is an option to deliberately lie by changing the bullets being used. Returning from Danganronpa 2: Goodbye Despair are Rebuttal Showdowns, in which the player must debate with a specific character to find a contradiction.

An example of Debate Scrum where the cast takes sides in an argument

Danganronpa V3 adds new gameplay elements to the Class Trials. Mass Panic Debates involve multiple characters talking over each other, which makes finding the correct statement harder, while Debate Scrums have groups of characters argue against each other, requiring the player to use statements from their side against the other side's statements. New minigames are also added. Hangman's Gambit 3.0 requires players to use light to pick out letters spelling out an answer. Mind Mine is a puzzle game requiring players to remove colored blocks in order to reveal an illustration. Finally, Psyche Taxi sees players driving a taxi, collecting letters for a question that they must then answer by picking up the correct escort. In addition to this, the previous games' Bullet Time Battle/Panic Talk Action minigames have been replaced with Argument Armament, another rhythm game where players must hit buttons in time to the beat before building a sentence from four groups of words at the end in order to silence a panicking character.

As in the previous games, there are also various modes outside the main game. The Death Road of Despair minigame is accessible by visiting the area under the manhole in the school: it is a platform game intentionally designed with a very high difficulty level, in which all 16 students try to escape the Ultimate Academy for Gifted Juveniles while trying to evade bombs, traps and holes. After finishing the main game, other modes are unlocked. Salmon Team Mode is an alternate mode similar to School Mode and Island Mode in the previous games, in which Monokuma decides to cancel the killing game and turn it into a dating reality show, allowing players to bond with the other characters. There are also two brand-new modes. The first one, Ultimate Talent Development Plan, has the player choosing any character from Danganronpa V3 (or from Danganronpa: Trigger Happy Havoc and Danganronpa 2: Goodbye Despair, after unlocking their cards) and advancing in an 8-bit game board representing their school life at Hope's Peak Academy while they increase their skills and interact with other characters. After completing this mode for the first time, a new mode is unlocked, Despair Dungeon: Monokuma's Test, where the player uses the characters developed in Ultimate Talent Development Plan to stop a horde of Monokuma creatures unleashed by the Monokuma Kubs in an 8-bit turn-based role-playing game.

== Plot ==
=== Characters ===
The game features 16 high-school students being forced into a mutual killing game. Each character has a special skill or ability, known as an Ultimate Talent. Danganronpa V3 is viewed from the point of view of two protagonists. Despite being advertised as the game's sole lead, Kaede Akamatsu is only a false protagonist, as she is no longer the player-character after the first chapter. The remainder of the game is played from Shuichi Saihara's perspective; the Ultimate Detective, reserved and unsure of his talents. Other participants of the Killing Game include child caregiver Maki Harukawa, anthropologist Korekiyo Shinguji, robot K1-B0 ("Keebo"), and astronaut Kaito Momota among several others. The game features a mascot character, an evil anthropomorphic talking robotic bear known as Monokuma who is in charge of the killing game. Alongside Monokuma, the game introduces the Monokubs, five smaller robot bears who serve as the secondary antagonists and are viewed as children by Monokuma.

=== Story ===
High school student Kaede Akamatsu is kidnapped and awakens trapped in Ultimate Academy for Gifted Juveniles, (Note: Known in Japan as Sai-shū Gakuen (才囚学園)) where she meets 15 fellow students including Shuichi Saihara. The group is abruptly accosted by the Monokubs who expose them to a "Flashback Light," a flashlight similar to a neuralyzer. When Kaede next awakens the students remember having ultimate talents; for example, Kaede is the "Ultimate Pianist" and Shuichi is the "Ultimate Detective". Monokuma – a robotic bear – arrives and informs the students that the only way to escape the academy is to successfully murder another student and not be voted as the culprit at the resulting trial, known as a class trial. Initially, the participants are unwilling to take part in the "killing game", until a new rule is imposed – if nobody is killed within two days, Monokuma will prematurely end the game by killing all of the students. Shuichi reasons that there must be a mastermind controlling Monokuma, and Kaede works with him to set a trap to expose the mastermind just prior to the time limit. Kaede secretly tries to kill the mastermind using this trap, but accidentally kills the amnesiac Rantaro Amami instead of the mastermind. During the following class trial, Kaede encourages Shuichi to expose her and is executed. Afterwards, Shuichi develops a friendship with the Ultimate Astronaut Kaito Momota, and the Ultimate Child Caregiver (later revealed Ultimate Assassin) Maki Harukawa. Many more murders occur throughout the game, with each culprit getting caught and executed. Ultimate Tennis Pro Ryoma Hoshi is willingly killed by Ultimate Maid Kirumi Tojo in hopes that she may escape the killing game and save Japan from destruction. Ultimate Artist Angie Yonaga and Ultimate Aikido Master Tenko Chabashira are killed by Ultimate Anthropologist Korekiyo Shinguji in his belief that killing people brings his dead sister "friends" in the afterlife. Ultimate Inventor Miu Iruma is killed by Ultimate Entomologist Gonta Gokuhara after he was manipulated into doing so by Ultimate Supreme Leader, Kokichi Oma.

The students find additional Flashback Lights and remember that they are students of the Hope's Peak Academy led by Makoto Naegi, whom he sent into space in the hopes of preserving humanity after meteors began to fall upon the Earth and a deadly epidemic had ravaged the remainder of the population. Near the end of the game, Kokichi reveals the outside world to be destroyed and claims to have returned the spaceship to Earth and masterminded the killing game. It is later revealed that Kokichi is in fact not the mastermind and, through a complex process, he collaborates with Kaito to create a murder in which either he or Kaito are plausible victims, to such a point that even Monokuma does not know whom was killed. Through Shuichi's deductions, it is eventually revealed that Kaito killed Kokichi, and is subsequently executed (however he fulfills his dream of going to space and dies to the virus during the execution, proving he can die on his own terms much to Monokuma's fury). Later, the students discover evidence contradicting their memories, as well as inconsistencies in Rantaro's crime scene. In response, Shuichi demands a retrial with Kaede's case. At the trial, Shuichi accuses Ultimate Cosplayer Tsumugi Shirogane of being the mastermind, having killed Rantaro and framed Kaede.

Tsumugi confesses and reveals that the students' memories, talents, relationships, and personalities are entirely fake, the Flashback Light being a brainwashing device and the destroyed world being a sound stage. The students are in fact taking part in "Danganronpa 53 (V3)", the 53rd season of a lethal reality TV show watched by millions based on the fictional Danganronpa media franchise. All of the Ultimates, barring Ultimate Robot K1-B0, were ordinary individuals who willingly had their previous lives' memories permanently erased in exchange for talent and a fake background who have joined purely for fame, fortune, or the thrill of the game, and were far less trusting and altruistic than their killing game selves. K1-B0 is revealed to be the camera for the viewers and possesses an antenna that lets them control him via popular vote. Tsumugi starts a vote between "Despair" and "Hope", with the former sacrificing Keebo so the rest of the students can stay in the academy, and the latter sacrificing Tsumugi and two other students so the other two can leave for the outside world.

Realising either choice will merely feed the audience's desire for more killing games, Shuichi encourages the other students to give the audience an unsatisfying ending by refusing to vote, even though this means they will all be executed. At the vote, all parties abstain including Tsumugi and K1-B0, the former willing to sacrifice herself to continue Danganronpa and the latter indicating the audience has given up on Danganronpa. As the remaining viewers tune out, a defeated Tsumugi orders K1-B0 to destroy the school. He does so, killing Tsumugi and Monokuma in the process, then activates his self-destruct feature. The survivors, Shuichi, Maki, and Ultimate Magician Himiko Yumeno consider the possibility that Tsumugi was lying about their past selves willingly signing up to participate in Danganronpa, and depart for the real world.

== Development ==
Danganronpa V3 was produced by Yoshinori Terasawa, and planned and written by Kazutaka Kodaka, while the character design was done by Rui Komatsuzaki. As with previous games in the series, the game's original score was composed and produced by Masafumi Takada. Like in previous games, Kodaka had the original ideas for the characters, citing characters Yumeno Himiko as a self proclaimed magician or Gonta as a caring gigantic man whom he found interesting to develop. The game was developed alongside the production of the anime series Danganronpa 3: The End of Hope's Peak High School, which Terasawa and Kodaka described as being difficult. The "V3" in the game's title was chosen to differentiate it from the anime. Terasawa and Kodaka described the game's production level as being much higher than that of previous games in the series. The team noted the PlayStation Vita version had multiple issues, so they worked on a patch. Through the demo, Spike listened to fan feedback in order to improve the game. With the game being released in Western regions, Kodaka looked forward to resting after having done multiple projects.

The game was intentionally designed with a school theme to mirror the first installment, yet also have a different aesthetic. Kodaka commented that the first chapter of the game took the longest time to make from all three games. Due to time constraints, Kodaka requested help from light novels Danganronpa Kirgiri author, Kitayama Takekuni. Originally series mascot Monokuma was not meant to appear in the game, but was added alongside the Monokubs to help make the title feel more like other Danganronpa games. There was division among the staff in the development team regarding whether the game should be a sequel or something new. The game was developed to have influences from previous titles, but to also feel "fresh". The game's theme was described as "psycho-cool" by the developers. Kodaka decided to focus on the concept of truth and lies, adding to the previous version's themes of hope and despair, which was heavily integrated into both the gameplay and narrative.

In contrast to previous works involving a protagonist briefly accused of being a culprit, Kodaka looked towards a twist that would shock the audience. Kodaka decided to make players believe Kaede Akamatsu would be the protagonist of the entire game. However, in the first chapter Akamatsu is revealed as the culprit of the first murder and dies when she is discovered by Shuichi Saihara. As a result, Kaede is executed for her apparent murder of Rantaro Amami. Afterwards, Shuichi takes over the role of protagonist. Kodaka was inspired by the twist of the first Danganronpa game where he tricked the audience that Sayaka Maizano was the heroine only for her to be the first victim in Monokuma's killing game. According to Kodaka, the seriousness of murder and the culprits coming to terms with being murderers were both motifs in Danganronpa. But in Kaede's case, it was different, since she did it in order to protect everyone, so she did not have the usual desperate panicking a culprit has.

The game's final twist where the entire franchise is revealed to be reality television show spanning 53 seasons was made with the idea of bringing a more interesting idea to the fans.

== Promotion and release ==
The existence of a third Danganronpa title was first teased in September 2013 with the announcement of Danganronpa Another Episode: Ultra Despair Girls. In March 2015, Kodaka revealed that Danganronpa V3 was in early development. The game was announced at Sony's Tokyo Game Show presentation in 2015, and was released for PlayStation 4 and PlayStation Vita on January 12, 2017, in Japan. A playable demo featuring Makoto Naegi and Hajime Hinata, the protagonists of Danganronpa: Trigger Happy Havoc and Danganronpa 2: Goodbye Despair, was released on December 20, 2016. The limited edition of the game included an original video animation based on Goodbye Despair, titled Super Danganronpa 2.5: Komaeda Nagito to Sekai no Hakaisha. Coinciding with the game's Japanese release, Danganronpa V3–themed PlayStation 4 and PlayStation Vita consoles were released in Japan. NIS America released the game on September 26, 2017, in North America, and on September 29, 2017, in Europe, delayed from its initially announced December 2016 release. Two multiple-disc soundtrack albums containing music from the game were released on February 24, 2017, through composer Masafumi Takada's music label, Sound Prestige Records.

In March 2017 Spike Chunsoft announced that a Windows version will also be released on September 26. The games were localized in English and French, and give the player a choice between the English and Japanese voice tracks.

NIS America rereleased the PlayStation 4 version together with Danganronpa 1 & 2 Reload in a physical bundle titled Danganronpa Trilogy on March 26 and 29, 2019, in North America and Europe, respectively. On September 25, 2020, Danganronpa V3 was temporarily removed from PlayStation Store, following the other games in the series, as the rights to publish the console versions of the games were transferred from NIS America to Spike Chunsoft, who no longer required their services following the establishment of their western subsidiary.

An enhanced version with the subtitle Anniversary Edition was announced in 2021. Just like the anniversary ports of the previous titles, it features the gallery mode for illustrations and voice lines, updated user interface, and support for touchscreen controls. During E3 2021, it was announced that this version of the game will be released for the Nintendo Switch in 2021, both as part of the Danganronpa Decadence bundle, as well as separately. Despite being announced first, versions for Android and iOS were delayed, and launched on April 11, 2022. A version for Windows 10 and Xbox One was announced at Tokyo Game Show on September 15, 2022, and released the same day.

== Reception ==
=== Critical ===
Reception

Aggregate score
Aggregator	Score
Metacritic	PS4: 81/100; Vita: 80/100; PC: 80/100

Review scores
Publication	Score
Destructoid	10/10
Electronic Gaming Monthly	4/5
Famitsu	10/10, 9/10, 9/10, 9/10
Game Informer	7/10
GameRevolution	4.5/5
GameSpot	7/10
IGN	8/10
Polygon	8/10

Danganronpa V3: Killing Harmony received "generally favorable" reviews from critics, and was the second highest rated PlayStation Vita game and fiftieth highest rated PlayStation 4 game of 2017 by review aggregator website Metacritic. Giving it a perfect score, CJ Andriessen of Destructoid praised the game's long Class Trials, especially enjoying the vulgar and chaotic interactions between the characters, though he still felt the story to drag. He ultimately surmised it as "the perfect summation of everything that is Danganronpa". GameRevolution's Cody Perez stated that the game had "highest peaks that the franchise has ever achieved, in addition to its lowest points" due to its multiple twist in the narrative and changes caused to the gameplay. Julia Lee writing for Polygon criticized the vulgar dialogue provided by the cast but felt that the comedy brought was required for the tone. In regards to the main plot, Lee felt that plot twists made some scenes "moving". Electronic Gaming Monthly's Mollie Patterson said that the first chapter of the game contained a surprising twist which moved her.

Its ending attracted divisive comments among critics. Kenneth Shepard, writing for CGMagazine, compared the premise of Killing Harmony, only fully revealed at the end of the game, to the anime Digimon Tamers, as both present the player or viewer to be the antagonist. He wrote that the reveal served as critical commentary on supply, demand, and artistic integrity, all while allowing for a "dignified" ending. Paul Lombardo for SuperJump claimed the ending was often "unconsidered commentary on consumerism" while noting players became bothered by the ending because they are labelled as people who enjoy seeing the cast suffering and cause Shuichi and other characters to express an emotional catharsis based on their realization of being fictional. As a result, the handling of these characters made Lombardo feel this was not a realistic game as he felt, in retrospective, that the characters from the first Danganronpa game behaved more like real humans based on how they react to the killing game. In regards to the ending, Griffin McElroy for Polygon said that "longtime fans of the series argue that this revelation robs the endings of the last two core Danganronpa games of meaning", making the third game as a more accurate way of ending not only the narrative but also the franchise. Lee said that while the endings are predictable, the execution of it was still entertaining. Perez praised the ending, saying "One of the greatest compliments I could ever give a game is that long after the credits roll, its ending stuck with me. [...] Danganronpa V3 joins that group without a doubt in my mind".

Heidi Kemps writing for IGN had mixed thoughts about the gameplay changes finding some enjoyable and other annoying. In regards to the narrative, Kemps described the cast as the best part due to how unique they are. Similar to previous games, the amount of plot twists were praised but the writer found some trials "dull". Patterson had skeptical thoughts about the gameplay such as the handling of multiple Truth Bullets, but felt this was a common issue with solving cases from every detective game where the player either knows the culprit before the cast or does not. Game Informer's Joe Juba was more critical, referring to the narrative as the weakest one provided by franchise so far, criticizing the plot's handling of culprits and motivations. The reviewer still appreciated the new minigame such as the board game and the reality show mode which further explores the dating sim elements from the franchise. Destructoid also praised the minigames as it gives the players more content to play after finishing the main story. Polygon praised the diversity within the Class Trials, as the constant minigames entertained the reviewer. Game Revolution criticized the Class Trials for taking too much time enough to make the player tired of the game.

=== Sales ===
Within its first week on sale in Japan, the game sold a total of 116,172 copies with the Vita version being the second best-selling game of the week and the PS4 version being the third best-selling game of the week. This would be the highest debut for a Danganronpa game and by February 2017, the PlayStation Vita version had sold over 115,840 copies in Japan. The Steam release had an estimated total of 73,400 players by July 2018. As of December 2017, the game had sold a total of 194,300 copies in Japan.

=== Accolades ===
The game was nominated for "Best Visual Novel" in PC Gamer's 2017 Game of the Year Awards; for "Best Portable Game" in Destructoid's Game of the Year Awards 2017; and for "Best Adventure Game" and "Most Innovative" in IGN's Best of 2017 Awards. It won the award for "Best Plot Twist" in Game Informer's 2017 Adventure Game of the Year Awards. In addition, the game was nominated for "Game, Franchise Adventure" at the 17th Annual National Academy of Video Game Trade Reviewers Awards, and won the Excellence Prize at the Famitsu Awards.
