= List of Danganronpa media =

Danganronpa
- Created by: Kazutaka Kodaka
- Owner: Spike Chunsoft
- Years: 2010–2021

Print publications
- Novel(s): Danganronpa Zero (2011) Danganronpa: Kirigiri (2013–2020) Danganronpa: The Animation (2013) Danganronpa: Togami (2015–2017) Danganronpa: 1･2 Beautiful Days (2015) Danganronpa: Makoto Naegi Secret File – The Worst Day Ever (2016)
- Comics: Ultra Despair Girls: Danganronpa AE − Genocider Mode (2015–2017) Danganronpa Gaiden: Killer Killer (2016–2017)

Films and television
- Television series: Danganronpa: The Animation (2013) Danganronpa 3: The End of Hope's Peak High School (2016) Super Danganronpa 2.5: Nagito Komaeda and the Destroyer of Worlds (2017)

Games
- Video game(s): Main series: Danganronpa: Trigger Happy Havoc (2010) Danganronpa 2: Goodbye Despair (2012) Danganronpa V3: Killing Harmony (2017): Spin-offs: Alter Ego (2012) Danganronpa: Monokuma Strikes Back (2012) Danganronpa Another Episode: Ultra Despair Girls (2014) Danganronpa: Unlimited Battle (2015) Cyber Danganronpa VR: The Class Trial (2016) Kirigiri Sou (2016) Danganronpa S: Ultimate Summer Camp (2021)

Danganronpa (Japanese: ダンガンロンパ) is a Japanese adventure visual novel video game franchise created by Kazutaka Kodaka and developed and owned by Spike Chunsoft (formerly Spike). The series surrounds a group of high school students who are coerced into murdering each other by a creature named Monokuma. Gameplay features a mix of adventure, visual novel, and dating sim elements. The first game, Danganronpa: Trigger Happy Havoc, was released for the PlayStation Portable in 2010; the second game, Danganronpa 2: Goodbye Despair, was released in 2012; and the third game, Danganronpa V3: Killing Harmony, was released for the PlayStation 4 and the PlayStation Vita in 2017.

Several spin-offs games have been released: Alter Ego and Danganronpa: Monokuma Strikes Back for Android and iOS in 2012; Danganronpa Another Episode: Ultra Despair Girls for the PlayStation Vita in 2014; Danganronpa: Unlimited Battle for Android and iOS in 2015; Cyber Danganronpa VR: The Class Trial for PlayStation 4 in 2016, Kirigiri Sou for Windows and macOS in 2016; and Danganronpa S: Ultimate Summer Camp for the Nintendo Switch in 2021.

Several original-storyline light novel series, primarily illustrated by Rui Komatsuzaki, have also been published by Seikaisha: Danganronpa Zero, written by Kazutaka Kodaka and published across two volumes in 2011; Danganronpa: Kirigiri, written by Takekuni Kitayama and published across seven volumes from 2013 to 2020; and Danganronpa: Togami, written by Yuya Sato, illustrated by Yun Kōga, and published across three volumes from 2015 to 2017, as well as manga series published by Kadokawa Shoten: Ultra Despair Girls: Danganronpa AE − Genocider Mode, written and illustrated by Machika Minami and Touya Hajime, and published from 2015 to 2017; and Danganronpa Gaiden: Killer Killer, written by Kodaka and Yōichirō Koizumi, illustrated by Mitomo Sasako, and published from 2016 to 2017.

== Media ==
=== Games ===
Main series

Game	Details
Danganronpa: Trigger Happy Havoc Original release date(s): November 25, 2010	Release years by system: 2010 – PlayStation Portable; 2012 – Android, iOS; 2013 – PlayStation Vita; 2016 – Windows, OS X, Linux; 2017 – PlayStation 4; 2021 – Nintendo Switch; 2022 – Xbox One
Danganronpa 2: Goodbye Despair Original release date(s): July 26, 2012	Release years by system: 2012 – PlayStation Portable; 2013 – PlayStation Vita; 2016 – Windows, OS X, Linux; 2017 – PlayStation 4; 2020 – Android, iOS; 2021 – Nintendo Switch; 2022 – Xbox One
Danganronpa V3: Killing Harmony Original release date(s): January 12, 2017	Release years by system: 2017 – PlayStation 4, PlayStation Vita, Windows; 2021 – Nintendo Switch; 2022 – Android, iOS, Xbox One

Spin-offs

Game	Details
Alter Ego Original release date(s): May 23, 2012	Release years by system: 2012 – Android, iOS
Danganronpa: Monokuma Strikes Back Original release date(s): May 23, 2012	Release years by system: 2012 – Android, iOS
Danganronpa Another Episode: Ultra Despair Girls Original release date(s): September 25, 2014	Release years by system: 2014 – PlayStation Vita; 2017 – PlayStation 4, Windows
Danganronpa: Unlimited Battle Original release date(s): January 7, 2015	Release years by system: 2015 – Android, iOS
Cyber Danganronpa VR: The Class Trial Original release date(s): October 13, 2016	Release years by system: 2016 – PlayStation 4
Kirigiri Sou Original release date(s): November 25, 2016	Release years by system: 2016 – Windows, macOS
Kirigiri Sou Original release date(s): November 25, 2016	Notes: Crossover sequel of Otogirisō and Danganronpa: Kirigiri
Danganronpa S: Ultimate Summer Camp Original release date(s): November 4, 2021	Release years by system: 2021 – Nintendo Switch; 2022 – Android, iOS, PlayStation 4, Windows
Danganronpa S: Ultimate Summer Camp Original release date(s): November 4, 2021	Notes: Expanded, standalone version of the board game mini-game from Danganronpa V3

Compilations

Game	Details
Danganronpa 1-2 Reload Original release date(s): March 14, 2017	Release years by system: 2017 – PlayStation 4
Danganronpa 1-2 Reload Original release date(s): March 14, 2017	Notes: Compilation includes: Danganronpa: Trigger Happy Havoc; Danganronpa 2: Goodbye Despair
Danganronpa Trilogy Original release date(s): March 26, 2019	Release years by system: 2019 – PlayStation 4
Danganronpa Trilogy Original release date(s): March 26, 2019	Notes: Compilation includes: Danganronpa: Trigger Happy Havoc; Danganronpa 2: Goodbye Despair; Danganronpa V3: Killing Harmony
Danganronpa Decadence Original release date(s): November 4, 2021	Release years by system: 2021 – Nintendo Switch
Danganronpa Decadence Original release date(s): November 4, 2021	Notes: Compilation includes: Danganronpa: Trigger Happy Havoc; Danganronpa 2: Goodbye Despair; Danganronpa V3: Killing Harmony; Danganronpa S: Ultimate Summer Camp

=== Anime ===
Title	Release	Studio
Danganronpa: The Animation	2013	Lerche
Danganronpa 3: The End of Hope's Peak High School	2016	Lerche

=== Manga ===
The following manga series have been produced:

- Danganronpa: Kibou no Gakuen to Zetsubou no Koukousei (ダンガンロンパ 希望の学園と絶望の高校生) (Illustrated by Hajime Touya, published in Enterbrain's Famitsu Comic Clear from 24 June 2011 – 18 October 2013)
- Danganronpa: Kibou no Gakuen to Zetsubou no Koukousei (ダンガンロンパ 希望の学園と絶望の高校生) - The Demo
- Danganronpa: Kibou no Gakuen to Zetsubou no Koukousei - 4Koma Kings (ダンガンロンパ 希望の学園と絶望の高校生 4コマKINGS) (Various artists, three volumes released between 25 July 2011 and 25 January 2014, published in DNA Media Comics DNAメディアコミックス)
- Danganronpa: Kibou no Gakuen to Zetsubou no Koukousei - Comic Anthology (ダンガンロンパ 希望の学園と絶望の高校生 コミックアンソロジー) (Various artists, three volumes released between 25 August 2011 and 25 February 2014, published in ASCII Media Works アスキー・メディアワークス)
- Danganronpa: Kibou no Gakuen to Zetsubou no Koukousei - The Animation (ダンガンロンパ 希望の学園と絶望の高校生: The Animation) (Illustrated by Samurai Takashi, published in Kadokawa Shoten's Shonen Ace from July 2013 – July 2014, published in English by Dark Horse Comics starting in March 2016)
- Danganronpa: Kibou no Gakuen to Zetsubou no Koukousei - The Animation - Comic Anthology (ダンガンロンパ 希望の学園と絶望の高校生 The Animation 電撃コミックアンソロジー) (Various artists, released 27 August 2013, published in ASCII Media Works)
- Super Danganronpa 2: Sayonara Zetsubou Gakuen (スーパーダンガンロンパ2 さよなら絶望学園) (Illustrated by Kuroki Kyu (黒軌キュー) and published in Famitsu Comic Clear from 10 December 2012)
- Super Danganronpa 2: Dangan Island - Kokoro Tokonatsu Kokoronpa♪ (スーパーダンガンロンパ2 だんがんアイランド ココロ常夏、ここロンパ♪) (Illustrated by Kaname Ryū (要 龍), published by Mag Garden from 30 October 2012 – 15 April 2013)
- Super Danganronpa 2: Chou-Koukou-Kyuu no Kouun to Kibou to Zetsubou (スーパーダンガンロンパ2 超高校級の幸運と希望と絶望) (Illustrated by Kyosuke Suka, published by Mag Garden from 10 November 2012)
- Super Danganronpa 2: Nanami Chiaki no Sayonara Zetsubou Daibouken (スーパーダンガンロンパ2 七海千秋のさよなら絶望大冒険) (Illustrated by Karin Suzuragi, published in Mag Garden's Monthly Comic Blade from December 2012)
- Super Danganronpa 2: Nangoku Zetsubou Carnival! (スーパーダンガンロンパ2 南国ぜつぼうカーニバル!) (Illustrated by Ayune Araragi| published in GA Bunko's GA Bunko Magazine from 14 April 2013)
- Super Danganronpa 2: Sayonara Zetsubou Gakuen - 4Koma Kings (スーパーダンガンロンパ2 さよなら絶望学園 4コマKINGS) (Various artists, four volumes released between 25 October 2012 and 25 October 2013, published in Ichijinsha 一迅社)
- Super Danganronpa 2: Sayonara Zetsubou Gakuen - Comic Anthology (スーパーダンガンロンパ2 さよなら絶望学園 コミックアンソロジー) (Various artists, four volumes released between 24 November 2012 and 25 November 2013, published in Ichijinsha)
- Super Danganronpa 2: Zetsubouteki Ingaritsu no Naka no Souda Kazuichi (スーパーダンガンロンパ2 絶望的因果律の中の左右田和一) (Illustrated by Hoshi Tomajirou ( 星 トマジロウ) and published in Kadokawa Shoten.
- Danganronpa 1･2 - Comic Anthology (ダンガンロンパ 1･2 コミックアンソロジー) (Published in Ichijinsha)
- Small Danganronpa 1・2 Light (スモール ダンガンロンパ 1・2 ライト) (Illustrated by Kingin きんぎん and published in ASCII Media Works)
- Zettai Zetsubou Shoujo: Danganronpa Another Episode − Genocider Mode (絶対絶望少女 ダンガンロンパ Another Episode ジェノサイダーモード) (Illustrated by Machika Minami, published in Kadokawa Shoten's Dengeki Maoh from 27 January 2015)
- Zettai Zetsubou Shoujo: Danganronpa Another Episode (絶対絶望少女 ダンガンロンパ Another Episode) (Illustrated by Hajime Touya, published in Kadokawa Shoten's Famitsu Comic Clear from 20 February 2015)
- Zettai Zetsubou Shoujo: Danganronpa Another Episode − Comic Anthology (絶対絶望少女 ダンガンロンパ Another Episode コミックアンソロジー)
- Danganronpa Gaiden: Killer Killer (ダンガンロンパ害伝 キラーキラー) (Illustrated by Mitomo Sasako, published across three volumes in Kodansha's Bessatsu Shōnen Magazine from 9 March 2016)
- Revival Shot!: Danganronpa − Itagaki Hako Sakuhin Shuu (リバイバルショット! ダンガンロンパ板垣ハコ作品集)
- Triple Bullet: Danganronpa − Watarizora Tsubamemaru Sakuhin Shuu (トリプルバレット ダンガンロンパ渡空燕丸作品集)
- Danganronpa 3: The End Of Kibougamine Gakuen − Mirai Hen / Zetsubou Hen - Dengeki Comic Anthology (ダンガンロンパ3 The End of 希望ヶ峰学園 ー 未来編 / 絶望編 電撃コミックアンソロジー)
- Danganronpa 3: The End Of Kibougamine Gakuen − Comic Anthology (ダンガンロンパ3 The End of 希望ヶ峰学園 コミックアンソロジー)
- New Danganronpa V3: Minna no Koroshiai Shingakki − Comic Anthology (ニューダンガンロンパV3: みんなのコロシアイ新学期 コミックアンソロジー)

=== Novels ===
Title	Release	Author	Notes
Danganronpa/Zero (ダンガンロンパ/ゼロ)	2011	Kazutaka Kodaka	Prequel novel
Danganronpa Kirigiri (ダンガンロンパ霧切), written by Takekuni Kitayama and illustrated by Rui Komatsuzaki (13 September 2013 – 17 June 2020, 7 volumes)	2013–2020	Takekuni Kitayama	Prequel novel series
Danganronpa: The Animation (ダンガンロンパ 希望の学園と絶望の高校生 The Animation) (20 September 2013 – 20 December 2013, 2 volumes)	2013	Ryo Kawakami & Takashi Tsukimi	Novelization of the first game
Danganronpa Togami (ダンガンロンパ十神) (27 November 2015 – February 2017, 3 volumes)	2015–2017	Takekuni Kitayama	Prequel novel trilogy
Danganronpa 1･2 Beautiful Days (ダンガンロンパ 1･2 Beautiful Days) (12 December 2015, 1 volume)	2015	Takekuni Kitayama	Novelization of the second game
Danganronpa: Makoto Naegi Secret File – The Worst Day Ever (ダンガンロンパ Makoto Naegi Secret File 苗木誠、人生最悪の日, Naegi Makoto, Jinsei Saiaku no Hi), included with special editions of the first Japanese Blu-ray and DVD release of Danganronpa: The Animation.	2016	Kazutaka Kodaka	Prequel to the first game
