= List of Killer Killer chapters =

Japanese manga series

Killer Killer is a Japanese manga series written by Kazutaka Kodaka and Yōichirō Koizumi and illustrated by Mitomo Sasako. Kodaka launched the manga in 2016's 11th issue of Kodansha's shōnen manga magazine Bessatsu Shōnen Magazine on March 8, 2016, and ran until May 9, 2017. Although a spin-off of the Danganronpa series published to tie in with the Danganronpa 3: The End of Hope's Peak Academy anime series, the series was not initially marketed as such, with its connection to Danganronpa and full title being used as the twist ending of the first volume.

== Volume list ==
=== Volume 1 ===
No.	Title	Original release date	English release date
1	01; Murder for Murder (殺人のための殺人)	March 8, 2016; 978-4-0639-5701-3	July 8, 2016; 978-4-0639-5701-3
Misaki Asano joins the Special Case Criminal Investigation Unit of the 6th Branch of the Future Foundation, where she meets Takumi Hijirihara, an agent with a tendency for hiding in small boxes, whom she is told will be her new partner. While working security at a monk idol's performance after they receive a death threat, they find themselves in pursuit of a mass murderer who has killed and dismembered 42 people and turned their corpses into grotesque Buddha statues. Annoyed at Takumi's "weird" behavior in general at the scene, specifically hugging the corpses and claiming offhand as to the culprit still being in the venue without elaborating and leaving her at the scene alone, Misaki complains about him to their section chief, Dougami Ikue, who informs Misaki that as a child, Takumi had been witness to "The Gibouchi Middle School Mass Murder Incident", having survived by hiding in a closet and that he had developed a preference for closed spaces and a dislike of violence as a result. Back at the scene of the crime, Takumi confronts the monk idol, informing him that he knows he is the killer, having deduced him to have used blood to maintain his youthful looks and to have sent the death threat to himself as an excuse to display his crime. Assuming he is going to be arrested, the idol is surprised when Takumi instead loves these kinds of murders beyond anything before ranking his murders "20 points". Realizing that Takumi is in fact "him", the idol admits all before attempting to kill Takumi and drink his blood. Deriding his reasons and lack of "love for murder", Takumi slices the idol into meat chunks using his atomic blade, while thinking back to the murder he witnessed as a child, and his resolution to become a "cool mass murderer" just like the assailant. Later, Misaki and Dougami investigate the scene, finding a letter signed by the murderer of murderers known as "Killer Killer", to which Dougami compliments "as always [the] cute paper." Returning to their office to find Takumi asleep under her desk, Misaki expresses a desire to know him better.
2	02. Kyōsei Hosupitaru; Symbiotic Hospital (共生ホスピタル)	April 9, 2016; 978-4-0639-5701-3	July 8, 2016; 978-4-0639-5701-3
Misaki and Takumi investigate the murder of a young woman in a hospital with her organs removed. While Misaki is annoyed by the number of surgeons and patients claiming fetishes related to the state of the body, Takumi falls in love with a nurse, Rei Shimizu (to which Misaki grows jealous), later questioning her over the crime. Misaki then has fellow agent Mekuru Katsuragi use her "Drowsing Deduction" (brought about by the thought process of always being on the brink of sleep) to deduce the murderer's potential location. Meeting the nurse at the hospital for a date, Takumi reveals to her that he loves everything about her except for her killing methods, revealing that he knows she is the culprit. The nurse then leaves, fleeing across nearby woods, before Takumi catches up to her and correctly deduces that she is a cultivator of parasites, having hidden their eggs within patients during surgery and removing them upon their return, having killed the patient due to their lack of requiring follow-up surgery to free the parasites. Rating her murder 30 points, Takumi deduces that the nurse is keeping the remaining parasites on her body, which subsequently merge and attack him. Takumi responds with a series of slices reducing the parasites, along with the nurse, to dust. Shortly afterward, the nurse's bosses find all information about her to have vanished from their computer system. Elsewhere, Misaki and Mekuru are showed to be tied up in a building.
3	03. Bessatsu Shōnen Zetsubō Magazine; Bessatsu Shōnen Despair Magazine (別冊少年ゼツボウマガジン)	May 8, 2016; 978-4-0639-5701-3	July 8, 2016; 978-4-0639-5701-3
Takumi has himself delivered in a box to the doorstep of a manga artist known for his hyper-realistic depictions of corpses in his biography of Junko Enoshima and "The Tragedy". After deriding his lack of passion for his killings, Takumi kills the artist in an identical fashion to the death of Mukuro Ikusaba, before a series of pages made out in the image of Monokuma, of whom they laugh in the style of. Meanwhile, former Ultimate Pyrotechnician Ted Chikatilo takes Misaki and Mekuru (her "Drowsing Deduction" having led them there) as hostages, apparently alongside Makoto Naegi, before calling Takumi and asking him to meet.

=== Volume 2 ===
No.	Title	Original release date	English release date
4	04; Sting Casino Murder (スティング・カジノ・マーダーズ)	June 9, 2016; 978-4-06-393103-7	November 9, 2016; 978-4-06-393103-7
Misaki's kidnapping is shown again from her perspective, as she is brought to a room by Ted and told to remain there quietly, before seeing an announcement welcoming people to "Serial Killer Gambling" festival, a battle tournament between serial killers held in an abandoned stadium which Misaki had thought to be an urban legend. After introducing himself, Ted throws the "corpse" of Makoto Naegi, in actuality an elaborate firework, into the center of the stadium, invigorating the crowd upon its explosion, at which point Takumi arrives on the scene and Ted challenges him to fight to the death. As their fight begins, Misaki wonders to herself why Takumi is there, as Ted traps Takumi inside a cannon, calling him "Killer Killer" before the crowd. As Ted clicks the button to set off the cannon, a different cannon instead blows up a portion of the crowd, exposing a second Ted; the first Ted is subsequently revealed to be the Ultimate Boxer and head of the Future Foundation's 6th branch, Juzo Sakakura.
5	05; Firework Lyrics (花火の歌詞)	July 8, 2016; 978-4-06-393103-7	November 9, 2016; 978-4-06-393103-7
Outraged at the presence of Sakakura, the crowd turn on him, to which he vigorously takes them on single-handedly. Earlier, Sakakura has the former Ultimate Make-Up Artist prepare a fake Makoto corpse for him to use to enter the festival, whom he dislikes greatly for his increased rank within the Future Foundation despite having arrived after Sakakura himself. As Sakakura calls upon special forces to arrest the crowd, the real Ted challenges Takumi to a true fight to the death, addressing him as Killer Killer, while Misaki is surprised to find the corpse of the Republic of Lameica's Secretary of Defence hanging off the side of the stadium, having been killed in the previous few minutes. After Misaki turns to find Takumi, Ted confronts Takumi atop the rooftop of the building above the stadium, where Takumi identifies him as Special Troops Platoon Head Kenji Tsuruhashi and the one to have killed the Secretary of Defence; Kenji bursts out laughing after Takumi then states that he "knows passionate killings." After ranking his murder 0 points and hanging him over the side of the building, Takumi is finally confronted by the real Ted, who after exploring a portion of the building attempts to brainwash him into serving him using a series of fireworks in the image of Disneyland Paris.
6	06; Possibility of Despair (絶望の可能性)	August 9, 2016; 978-4-08-881076-8	November 9, 2016; 978-4-06-393103-7
Arriving on the rooftop in response to the explosion, Misaki finds Takumi apparently mesmerized by Ted's fireworks, before becoming mesmerized herself. After Misaki is mesmerized and Ted launches another firework at them, Takumi reveals himself to have been faking his mesmerization to prevent the incoming Misaki from learning him to be Killer Killer, confronting Ted with his eyes closed and atomic blade brandished. Granting Ted's murders 65 points, Takumi compliments his passion for fireworks but derides his lack of similar passion for the actual act of killing itself, before redirecting all of Ted's fireworks back upon himself, destroying the building as Takumi leaves, carrying Misaki in his arms. After bringing Misaki to receive medical attention from Sakakura, Takumi collapses, exposing a Killer Killer note of his he planned to leave at the previous scene. Later, reporting to Future Foundation Vice-Chairman and Head of the Second Branch Kyousuke Munakata, Sakakura agrees that despite being Killer Killer, Takumi holds "no possibility of despair" and could serve as a helpful asset to the organization along the lines of Genocide Jill if they "use him right." In the hospital, Misaki is comforted by Mekuru, who apologizes for not telling her that their kidnapping had been staged, and insisting that Takumi cannot be the Killer Killer due to his basic incompetence, subsequently exposing him sitting in the room's locker with a bandaged head. Subsequently, the trio then find themselves confronted by Future Foundation 14th Branch Head and former Ultimate Detective Kyoko Kirigiri, who states her belief that the pair had been rescued by "the real Killer Killer", before questioning Takumi as to the status of her suspect, his former middle school classmate Shuuji Fujikawa, whom Takumi claims not to know. Elsewhere, in the remains of Gibouchi Middle School, Shuuji sits in a locker in a similar manner to Takumi, looking at a photograph of himself with Takumi and wondering why Takumi became the Killer Killer.
7	07; Pre-Wedding Mystery Tour (結婚式前のミステリーツアー)	September 8, 2016; 978-4-06-393103-7	November 9, 2016; 978-4-06-393103-7
While relaxing at a hot springs on a mandatory company outing for two, Misaki helps Takumi work through his apparent drunk state, before returning to their booked room and finding they have been given one intended for a romantically-involved couple. While attempting to separate the conjoined futons, Misaki wonders to herself whether Takumi's reasoning for getting drunk was a genuine romantic interest in herself. Later that evening, the pair discover the scene of a murder, of which a man had been decapitated and his head left atop his body on all fours. Revealing themselves as Future Foundation agents, Takumi states he will investigate the scene while Misaki sleeps, quickly deducing the identity of the murderer to be a woman who had been stalking the man, confronting her in the public bathroom. After ranking her murder 12 points, Takumi decapitates the woman and proceeds to dispose of her body. At the same time, back in her room, Misaki awakes to find the roof of the building gone and Shuuji Fujikawa sitting in her room, who informs her that Takumi is indeed the Killer Killer, and asks for her help in getting him to quit being so.
8	08; Beginning of Killer Killer (キラーキラーの始まり)	October 9, 2016; 978-4-06-393103-7	November 9, 2016; 978-4-06-393103-7
Several years previously, Shuuji and Takumi meet in middle school after the former accidentally stands on the latter's face, the pair becoming best friends and Shuuji developing a romantic interest in Takumi, one day discussing with him his desire to become a policeman and recommending that Takumi follow a similar career path in an attempt to overcome his hemophobia. Immediately after discussing their shared dislike for blood and gore, the pair hear screams from downstairs and Shuuji looks to investigate. Finding someone to have slaughtered a group of their fellow students, Shuuji picks up Takumi without letting him see the bloodshed and runs in the opposite direction away from them. Finding an empty classroom, Shuuji places Takumi inside a locker in the back of the room, asking that he not leave for his own protection, before hiding in the other locker next to him. However, more students come running into the room, and from their respective lockers, the pair witness the assailant, Ultimate Soldier Mukuro Ikusaba, slaughter everyone who enters through decapitation and bisection using her sword. As Shuuji thinks with disgust as to the sight before him, worrying as to Takumi's state of mind, Takumi marvels as to the beauty of blood, wondering to himself why he had never noticed it before. In the present, Shuuji concludes that it was this moment that turned Takumi into the Killer Killer, lamenting his decision to put Takumi into a different locker than the one he himself was in. As Misaki remarks relief at Mukuro having been long since dead, the eavesdropping Takumi, emerging from a nearby vent, receives a phone call from Dougami informing him that an alive Mukuro has escaped from the custody of the Future Foundation.

=== Volume 3 ===
No.	Title	Original release date	English release date
9	09; Don't Kill (殺さないで)	November 8, 2016; 978-4-06-393202-7	May 9, 2017; 978-4-06-393202-7
As Takumi thinks to himself that he was certain that Mukuro Ikusaba was already dead, he proceeds to the Future Foundation 8th Branch, ignoring Shuuji and Misaki as the latter tries to stop him. At the building, Takumi initially does not recognize Shuuji until Shuuji recalls how Takumi had worked as a mercenary prior to becoming Killer Killer, in an attempt to become exactly like Mukuro herself. Remaining in denial, Misaki questions Takumi as to whether he is in fact the Killer Killer, a question Takumi does not respond to. Opening the door to find most of the 8th Branch's security team massacred, Misaki sees Mukuro Ikusaba running towards the group, killing the remaining security team members while en-route. However, upon reaching Takumi, Mukuro is grabbed by her neck and strangled, him asking her "not to fuck with me" before attempting to impale her with her own sword, an attempt thwarted by Shuuji, who begs for him not to kill again, declaring "murder [to be] the most disgusting deplorable thing that happens in this world!!" Shuuji subsequently finds himself surrounded by several other Mukuro Ikusabas, all chanting "Kill.", whom Mikari deduces to be clones. After quickly killing the others, Takumi declares to the first Mukuro that "No matter how much you mimic, you can't compare to the real deal.", before cutting off her arm and facing down several more Mukuros, marking their murders 0 points. After Mikari attempts to convince Takumi not to kill them all, Takumi instead bisects the remaining Mukuro with a single swing of his sword. Finally accepting that Takumi is the Killer Killer, Mikari looks on in tears, as a tearful Shuuji stabs her from behind, again asking Takumi to stop killing.
10	10; Killer Killer Killer (キラーキラーキラー)	December 9, 2016; 978-4-06-393202-7	May 9, 2017; 978-4-06-393202-7
Recognizing Takumi to be in love with her, Shuuji holds Mikani hostage, promising to let her go if Takumi promises to "swear you will never kill again!!" Admitting that he himself was also changed by the middle school massacre, Shuuji thinks back to immediately after Mukuro left the room, how upon coming across their class representative, whose eyes, nose, and teeth Mukuro had removed, he had stamped him to death in a panicked state as a mercy killing before vomiting on the ground. As Shuuji that he needs to "clean" the world of all murderers, Mukuro is greeted outside the school by her younger twin sister Junko Enoshima, who remarks that since she had returned to the country she had been worried whether Mukuro had lost her "touch", and upon seeing that she hasn't, remarks that Mukuro's "power test wasn't even necessary", but nonetheless being glad that she enjoyed it and promising her something much more fun next time. In subsequent years, after the two "Despair Sisters" cause world society to break down in the name of "Ultimate Despair", Shuuji kills every serial killer he comes across as a vigilante, with newspapers coming to refer to him as "the Killer Killer.", news which surprises Mikari in the present. In the past, while preparing to kill another serial killer using a sniper rifle after they have killed a young woman, Shuuji decides he has had enough and not to kill anymore. However, moments later, he witnesses Takumi decapitate the serial killer with his sword through his scope, who then states down Shuuji's scope from a distance. Horrified to learn that Takumi had become a copycat serial killer from the same incident, albeit one who genuinely enjoys killing others, not in the name of justice, but to become closer to being like Mukuro Ikusaba. Shuuji subsequently swears to stop Takumi from killing. In the present, Shuuji reveals that he had been the one to gather the cult of girls who worshipped Mukuro Ikusaba to attack the building as a sort of shock therapy, hoping that Takumi once again witnessing a simulated version of murder by Mukuro Ikusaba would similarly break him free of his psychosis and allow him to notice the hideousness of murder and his own mistakes, being outraged by the lack of change. As he is about to reluctantly kill Mikani in an attempt to free Takumi, Shuuji finds himself confronted by the leaders of that branch of the Future Foundation. Unwilling to fight them, Shuuji flees the scene in an explosion after identifying Takumi as the Killer Killer. Takumi notices Shuuji to have attached a metal ring around Mikari's neck.
11	11; My Buddy Is You (私の相棒はあなたです)	January 8, 2017; 978-4-06-393202-7	May 9, 2017; 978-4-06-393202-7
The following day, held in the Future Foundation 6th Branch Inquiry Room, Takumi is questioned over his connection to Shuuji and being the Killer Killer, refusing to respond, as his interrogators reveal Shuuji to have stolen several untested potentially world-ending military bombs. Elsewhere, Mikani awakens to Mekuru lying next to her in her hospital bed, who infers that she did in fact know that Takumi was the Killer Killer. After promising to help her track him down, the pair are interrupted by a news broadcast sent to every television in the world, displaying a black screen with the words "Killer Killer" upon it. Moments later, Shuuji appears on the screen, declaring himself to be the Killer Killer and providing "proof" by slitting the throat of a serial killer, in actuality a corpse in a room containing the corpses of everyone he had killed as Killer Killer prior to giving up the mantle. Declaring his desire to rid the world of all human beings due to the potential for anyone to become a murderer, Shuuji reveals himself to have placed the stolen bombs all over the country, which while not being an extinction-level event would kill hundreds of thousands. Shuuji then reveals that to prevent the bombs from going off, someone must kill Misaki Asano over the next 24 hours, with the necklace around her neck being the bomb's disarming device, the condition being her death, with its removal prior to said point resulting in the bombs exploding, with the message ending with a personal message to Takumi asking what he will do. As Mekuru assures a panicking Misaki that she will be fine, several Future Foundation agents enter the room with the intent of detaining her for her own protection. As Mekuru engages them in combat to protect Misaki, Misaki proceeds to Takumi's cell, where she apologizes for how he is, frees him of his bonds, hands him a knife, and asks him to kill her, additionally asking him to promise that she will be the last person he ever kills. Takumi instead knocks out Misaki and flees the building with her in his arms, evading the forces of the Future Foundation and bringing her to the sewers. After foiling her suicide attempt to disarm the bombs, Takumi promises to kill Misaki, but only after he firstly kills Shuuji, holding her hands and staring her in the eyes while saying that "I will definitely kill you with my own hands because that will be my passionate killing."
12	12; To Each Their Own Murder Intent (それぞれの殺人の意図に)	February 9, 2017; 978-4-06-393202-7	May 9, 2017; 978-4-06-393202-7
After returning to the surface, Takumi and Mikari are confronted by a group of civilians who attempt to kill Mikari, before the Future Foundation attempt to arrest the pair. As Mikari prepares to respond to both, the duo then finds themselves protected by the Remnants of Despair, followers of Junko Enoshima who intend to protect Mikari and let the bombs explode. As all three groups engage each other in combat, Shuuji looks on from a hijacked CCTV stream. Alerted as to their location by Sakakura, Vice-Chairman Munakata arrives in an attempt to take Mikari into custody, meeting Takumi in person before convincing him to surrender by placing a sword to his throat. Suddenly, Head of the Future Foundation First Branch and Chairman Kazuo Tengan arrives on the scene, claiming to have had a nearby appointment, and formally requesting that Takumi and Mikari be left on their way to try things their way firstly, which Munakata allows after Mikari states she believes Takumi to be "worthy of love" after being questioned as to her intuition, and would not mind if Takumi had to kill her, "as that would be a passionate killing." As the pair leave, Munakata questions Tengan about the detonator he had discreetly placed in Mikari's pocket, revealing he is more than willing to detonate it and stop the bombs should the pair decide to let hundreds of thousands die in their place, stating his reasoning to be that "In order to grasp true hope, sometimes extreme circumstances are necessary." With just over ten minutes left on Mikari's timer, Takumi arrives at his former middle school, knowing Shuuji will be within.
13	13; Killer Killer Is Dead (キラーキラーは死んでいる)	March 8, 2017; 978-4-06-393202-7	May 9, 2017; 978-4-06-393202-7
Entering the building and finding Shuuji within the locker he had originally hidden in, Takumi helps him stand up out of it before holding a knife to his throat and asking that he unlock her collar. Noting he "can't have my murder extermination without killing all people". Shuuji instead shoots at Mikari, to which Takami accepts the bullet. Outraged at Takumi's lack of logic and love of Mikari of Shuuji himself, Shuuji repeatedly slams the door of the locker before launching her out of the window with a grenade. Expecting to die, Mikari is instead surprised when she is caught by Chief Dougami, having tracked them down using Mekuru's "Drowsing Deduction", before the Future Foundation begins storming the building. Inside the building, Shuuji apologizes for losing control out of jealousy and asks Takumi to be friends with him again so that they may together "make the world murderless." Takumi instead praises Shuuji for his own "murders" via proxy with 100 points. Denying his actions constitute murder, to which Takumi derides them not to be "passionate killings", Shuuji then brings out a blade and the pair engage in evenly-matched combat, concluding in Shuuji bringing Takumi to the brink of death by strangling him, Takumi monologuing that "Murder is Beautiful" and Shuuji monologuing that "Murder is Disgusting.". Recalling watching the killing game on television, Takumi then impales himself through his chest, also impaling Shuuji.
14	14; Killer Killer (キラーキラー)	April 9, 2017; 978-4-06-393202-7	May 9, 2017; 978-4-06-393202-7
After allowing Shuuji to fall back to the ground, Takumi declares that "...This is... a passionate killing." After the Future Foundation arrives to check on their wounds, and both see Mikari to still be alive with less than two minutes left on her timer, Shuuji robs Takumi of his murder by setting off his suicide vest, also robbing the Future Foundation a method of disarming the bombs. Elsewhere, with 30 seconds left on Mikari's timer, Chairman Tengan prepares to kill her remotely, as Chief Dougami similarly prepares to have her men shoot Mikari. However, Takumi instead cuts apart the group's guns. With one second left on Mikari's timer, Takumi keeps his promise and decapitates her, grabbing the necklace out of midair before her head lands again on her neck completely level, allowing it to heal and for her to live, the necklace reading the bombs to have been disabled. In their amazement at Mikari's survival, the Future Foundation does not notice Takumi leave the scene. Subsequently, Mikari monologues that Takumi was publicly confirmed as the Killer Killer, with the Future Foundation being unable to find a single report of him being witnessed anywhere, assuming in a worst-case scenario that he had died of his injuries. As the war between hope and despair continues, with the Remnants of Despair being captured, Mikari finishes up her report on the incident, lamenting as to Takumi's promise to her. Noticing a sound in her office, Mikari realizes that Takumi is in her locker. The couple then passionately embrace, with Takumi promising to "kill you for my entire life", indicating they will remain together, to which Mikari accepts. The following day, Chief Dougami finds a final Killer Killer note from Takumi in the locker serving as their farewell, to which she smiles and once again remarks as to the "cute stationary."
15	15. Omake; Juuzou Sakakura's Misfortune (おまけ)	May 9, 2017; 978-4-06-393202-7	May 9, 2017; 978-4-06-393202-7
In a bonus story, the events of Killer Killer are shown from the perspective of Juuzou Sakakura, and the displeasure caused to him.
