= Togami (disambiguation) =

Togami may refer to:

== People ==
- Kenshi Togami (戸上 研之, 1912–?), Japanese long jumper
- Ichirō Togami, Imperial Japanese Navy rear admiral
- Shunsuke Togami, Japanese table tennis player
- Masao Togami, Japanese swimmer
- Warren Togami, Hawaiian founder of Fedora Linux
- Wendy Togami, American daughter of Don Soderquist
- Masashi Togami, Japanese Lego Cuusoo winner

== Fictional characters ==
- Dr. Sueko Togami, a research assistant portrayed by Kumi Mizuno in Frankenstein Conquers the World
- Ms. Togami (栂見), a possessed nymphomaniac teacher in Urotsukidōji: Legend of the Overfiend
- Togami family in Ryūsei no Kizuna
  - Yukinari Togami, the heir to the Togami western restaurant chain
  - Masayuki Togami, Yukinari's father and the owner of the Togami western restaurant chain
  - Kimiko Togami, Yukinari's mother and Masayuki's wife
- Togami family in Danganronpa
  - Byakuya Togami, the "Ultimate Affluent Progeny" and agent of the Future Foundation
  - Kazuya "Sagishi" Togami, the "Ultimate Imposter" who impersonates Byakuya and others
  - Blue Ink / Kudan, Byakuya's biographer, who believes themselves to be Shinobu Togami
  - Suzuhiko Ootsuki (né Togami), the "Ultimate Hitman" known by the codename "The Moleman"
  - Orvin Elevator, an agent of the World Health Organization who purports to be the true Kazuya Togami
  - Kijō (né Tarou) Togami, the former head of the Togami family and father to the 108 Togami children
  - Asa, Hiru, and Yoru Togami, the triplets collectively known as the "Ultimate Weather Forecaster"
  - Shinobu Togami, an emotionally unstable victim of child abuse
  - Ichirou Togami, the former "Ultimate Surgeon"
  - Jirou Togami, the unstable "Ultimate Karate Master"
  - Takaya Togami, the intelligent "Ultimate Agitator"
  - Yuusuke Togami, the alcoholic former "Ultimate Gourmet"
  - Asagao Togami, an incredibly depressed, outwardly nice person
  - Mitsuzou Togami, a vain, cowardly person known for "using people"
  - Eyumi Togami, a gloomy but perceptive warmonger and war profiteer
  - Saburou Togami, a reclusive and heavyset pervert
  - Wasuke Togami, a sniveling but determined gossip
  - Shirou Togami, an observant musician

== Literature ==
- Danganronpa Togami, a light novel written by Yuya Sato
- Togami, a fictional western restaurant chain in Ryūsei no Kizuna
