= Who Killed Cock Robin? =

Who Killed Cock Robin? may refer to:

- "Cock Robin", a nursery rhyme
- Who Killed Cock Robin (film), a 2017 Taiwanese film
- Who Killed Cock Robin? (1935 film), a 1935 animated short film in the Silly Symphonies series
- "Who Killed Cock Robin?" (Randall and Hopkirk Deceased), an episode of the British television series Randall and Hopkirk (Deceased)
- "Who Killed Cock Robin?", an episode of the British television detective drama Midsomer Murders
- "Who Killed Cock Robin", an episode of the Future Arc of Danganronpa 3: The End of Hope's Peak High School
- Who Killed Cock Robin, the first chapter of the Japanese manga series Deadman Wonderland by Jinsei Kataoka and Kazuma Kondou
