= Third Time's the Charm =

Third Time's the Charm may refer to:

- "Third Time's the Charm" (Danganronpa 3: The End of Hope's Peak High School), 2016 television episode
- Third Time's the Charm, an album by Protoje

== See also ==
- Third Time's a Charm (disambiguation)
- Third Time Lucky (disambiguation)
