= Third Time's a Charm =

Third Time's a Charm may refer to:

- Third Time's a Charm, an album by Better Luck Next Time
- "Third Time's a Charm" (Ben 10: Omniverse), 2014 TV episode

== See also ==
- Third Time's the Charm (disambiguation)
- Third Time Lucky (disambiguation)
