= Third Time Lucky =

Third Time Lucky may refer to:

- Third Time Lucky (1931 film), a British comedy
- Third Time Lucky (1949 film), a British drama
- Third Time Lucky (TV series), a 1982 British television sitcom
- "Third Time Lucky" (song), a 1994 song by Basia
- "Third Time Lucky", a song by Foghat, from the 1979 album Boogie Motel
- "Third Time Lucky", a 1986 short story by Tanya Huff

== See also ==
- House of Angels – Third Time Lucky, a 2010 Swedish film
- Princess Diaries: Third Time Lucky, a 2001 book by Meg Cabot
- Third Time's a Charm (disambiguation)
- Third Time's the Charm (disambiguation)
