= Killer Killer =

Japanese manga series

- Third tankōbon volume cover, featuring (from left to right): Shuji Fujigawa, Takumi Hijirihara, Misaki Asano

ダンガンロンパ 害伝キラーキラー (Danganronpa Gaiden Kirā Kirā)
- Manga
- Written by: Kazutaka Kodaka; Yōichirō Koizumi
- Illustrated by: Mitomo Sasako
- Published by: Kodansha
- Imprint: Shōnen Magazine Comics
- Magazine: Bessatsu Shōnen Magazine
- Original run: March 8, 2016 – May 9, 2017
- Volumes: 3

Danganronpa Gaiden: Killer Killer (ダンガンロンパ 害伝キラーキラー, Danganronpa Gaiden Kirā Kirā), originally known simply as Killer Killer for its first volume, is a Japanese manga series written by Kazutaka Kodaka and Yōichirō Koizumi and illustrated by Mitomo Sasako. It was published by Kodansha in the magazine Bessatsu Shōnen Magazine from March 8, 2016, to May 9, 2017, and collected in three tankōbon volumes. The series focuses on Misaki Asano, a young woman assigned to the Future Foundation's 6th branch, dedicated to murder investigations in the midst of "The Tragedy", as she is teamed up with fellow investigator Takumi Hijirihara, a secret serial killer who only kills other killers, for the honor of Mukuro Ikusaba.

Although a spin-off of the Danganronpa series published to tie in with the Danganronpa 3: The End of Hope's Peak Academy anime series, the series was not initially marketed as such, with its connection to Danganronpa and full title being used as the twist ending of the first volume. The series has received a universally positive critical reception.

== Development ==
In JVL's interview with Kazutaka Kodaka in July 2017 promoting Danganronpa V3: Killing Harmony, Kodaka confirmed that the characters of Killer Killer were originally developed for use in the Danganronpa 3: The End of Hope's Peak Academy anime series, with the manga entering development as a tie-in after they had been cut, but deemed "too interesting not to be written about", based a character concept from Danganronpa 2: Goodbye Despair of Sonia Nevermind discussing her interview with Sparkling Justice / Killer Killer. Consequentially asked in response to questions over whether he was "tired" of Danganronpa following the release of Killer Killer, Kodaka stated that for a future follow-up, he would "work on my own initiative. It takes me time, it can be a little tiring, but never mentally seen that I do what I like. Of course I also try to please people, but I also like to please myself."

== Characters ==
Misaki Asano (麻野 美咲, Asano Misaki) – The main character, a new recruit to the 6th Division of the Future Foundation who "striv[es] to bring light in a world ridden with despair", and is assigned to the Special Case Bureau as an investigator, specializing in murder investigations despite her dislike of gore. After swiftly solving her first case only for the culprit to be themselves murdered by the serial killer "Killer Killer", Misaki makes it her personal mission to track Killer Killer down, unaware that he is her new partner Takumi, towards whom she shows romantic interest.

Takumi Hijirihara (聖原 拓実, Hijirihara Takumi) – A member of the Future Foundation and investigator whom Misaki is assigned to as a partner, who is secretly the psychopathic serial killer known as Killer Killer (キラーキラー, Kirā Kirā), who only kills other serial killers in the name of Mukuro Ikusaba and her Ultimate Despair after she had slaughtered several students in his middle school in front of him, and he had fallen in love with her, sparing them if he deems their passion for killing to be pure. Takumi is later revealed to have previously also once operated in Spain as a mercenary. Unbeknownst to Takumi, the Future Foundation leadership is well aware of his identity, doing nothing about him due to deeming his activities as beneficial to their cause.

Shuji Fujigawa (藤川 修二, Fujigawa Shūji) – Takumi's middle-school friend, who was also inspired to become a "Killer Killer" by Mukuro's massacre without any idea that Takumi had also been. Unlike Takumi, Shujii is gay, initially obsessed with "cleaning" the world of murder (which he sees as an "inherently disgusting and dirty thing") by travelling around the world and hunting down serial killers as a vigilante. However, upon returning to Japan and discovering that Takumi was also murdering killers in order to recreate the beauty he saw in Mukuro's massacre, a horrified Shuji abandoned his career and decided to "save" Takumi (whom he is in love with) from himself by whatever means.

Mukuro Ikusaba (戦刃 むくろ, Ikusaba Mukuro) – The seemingly deceased Ultimate Soldier (超高校級の「軍人」, Chō-kōkō-kyū no "Gunjin"; lit. Super High School Level Soldier) of Hope's Peak Academy and the overarching antagonist of the series, the original Ultimate Despair (with her sister Junko Enoshima), who massacred Takumi's and Shujii's middle school on her own when they were children, unknowingly respectively driving them to become serial killers of other serial killers as young adults. In the third volume, Mukuro is apparently revealed to be alive (after her apparent death in the 2010 video game Danganronpa: Trigger Happy Havoc) and a prisoner of the Future Foundation, until it is revealed to not be Mukuro but a cult of people who have had plastic surgery to appear identical to Mukuro raiding the facility under command by Shuji so that Takumi would be forced to repeatedly kill visages of his idol.

== Volumes ==
The series includes 14 chapters, which have been collected into three tankōbon volumes, the first of which was published in July 2016.

No.	Japanese release date	Japanese ISBN
1	July 8, 2016	978-4-06-3957013
2	November 9, 2016	978-4-06-3931037
3	May 9, 2017	978-4-06-3932027

== Reception ==
ILoveVG praised the series as "beautiful", complimenting its "many interesting insights" and recontextualisation of the events of Danganronpa 2: Goodbye Despair and Danganronpa 3: The End of Hope's Peak High School.

== See also ==
- Pedro Rodrigues "Killer Killer Petey" Filho (born 1954), a convicted teenage vigilante-turned-YouTuber known for exclusively killing other criminals, drug dealers, rapists, and murderers.
- Dexter Morgan, a fictional American serial killer who almost exclusively kills other serial killers, created by Jeff Lindsay and based on Filho.
  - Dexter, a 2004 black comedy crime horror novel series also about a serial killer who almost exclusively kills other serial killers.
  - Dexter, a 2006 television series adaptation of Dexter produced for Showtime, about a serial killer who almost exclusively kills other serial killers.
  - Dexter: New Blood, a 2022 limited series revival of Dexter, about a serial killer who almost exclusively kills other serial killers.
