= Cyber Danganronpa VR: The Class Trial =

2016 video game

- Developer: Spike Chunsoft
- Publisher: Spike Chunsoft
- Director: Toyokazu Sakamoto
- Producer: Yoshinori Terasawa
- Designer: Yasuhiro Abe
- Programmer: Kazunori Hanashima
- Artist: Satoshi Tsurumi
- Series: Danganronpa
- Engine: Unreal Engine 4
- Platform: PlayStation 4
- Release: JP: October 13, 2016; NA: March 7, 2017; EU: March 10, 2017
- Genre: Adventure
- Mode: Single-player

Cyber Danganronpa VR: The Class Trial (Note: Japanese: サイバーダンガンロンパVR 学級裁判, Hepburn: Saibā Danganronpa VR Gakkyū Saiban) is a free-to-play virtual reality tech demo in the Danganronpa series, developed and published by Spike Chunsoft for the PlayStation 4 for use with the PlayStation VR virtual reality headset. It was produced by Yoshinori Terasawa at Spike Chunsoft, who was inspired to create the game after playing Bandai Namco Entertainment's Summer Lesson.

The game was released in Japan on October 13, 2016, and worldwide in March 2017. The game is a tech demo where the player aims to uncover who was behind a murder in a "class trial" from the first game in the series, Danganronpa: Trigger Happy Havoc. It was well received by critics, who enjoyed its visuals.

== Gameplay ==
The player partakes in a class trial, and turns their head to aim the camera at characters whose testimony they want to refute.

Cyber Danganronpa VR is a virtual reality tech demo in which the player plays through the fourth "class trial" from the adventure game Danganronpa: Trigger Happy Havoc, where the player aims to uncover who was behind the murder of Sakura Ogami; unlike the original game, which uses 2D cutouts for characters, Cyber Danganronpa VR uses 3D models. The player character's classmates give testimonies, which appear as words; if the player notices something in the testimony that seems suspicious, they can refute the words by shooting them with "truth bullets". To do this, the player needs to turn their head toward the character who testified, and press a button on the DualShock 4 controller. The game takes around ten minutes to play through, and ends with a first-person sequence where the character Monokuma executes the player.

== Development and release ==
Cyber Danganronpa VR was announced and shown at the Animation-Comic-Game Hong Kong fair in July 2015 by Sony Interactive Entertainment, as a tech demo for their virtual reality headset PlayStation VR. The tech demo was developed by Spike Chunsoft, and was their first PlayStation 4 project. According to producer Yoshinori Terasawa, he was inspired to create the game by Bandai Namco Entertainment's PlayStation VR title Summer Lesson. The reason for making a game based on Trigger Happy Havoc rather than the spin-off shooting game Danganronpa Another Episode: Ultra Despair Girls was that other companies could create virtual reality shooting games, and that the developers wanted to create something that only they could make. Terasawa decided to make the punishment sequence play out from a first-person perspective to make the player feel horror, but also included Monokuma to lighten the mood. To be able to complete the tech demo quickly, the developers made use of the game engine Unreal Engine 4.

The tech demo was released digitally for the PlayStation 4 on October 13, 2016 in Japan and Hong Kong; it was made available freely for PlayStation Plus subscribers, with no release announced for players without a subscription. The Hong Kong release was made available in English, with English voice overs; Spike Chunsoft announced in October 2016 that they were working towards releasing that version in the West. It was released in North America on March 7, 2017, and in Europe on March 10.

== Reception ==
Hardcore Gamer's Edward Dang was positive to the tech demo, and hoped that it would lead to virtual reality releases of complete Danganronpa games. Jordan Devore at Destructoid thought that the game did not look exciting based on off-screen footage, but noted that this often is the case for virtual reality games, and thought that it "could be the start of something neat". Chris Carter, also writing for Destructoid, enjoyed the tech demo and called it worth playing, but not something to get excited over due to its short length. Aki Otsuki at 4Gamer.net recommended the game, and said that experiencing the punishment sequence in virtual reality was horrifying. Famitsu liked the immersion given by the virtual reality and the 360-degree movements. Hiroaki Mabuchi at IGN Japan said that the new environment graphics were a great reproduction of their Trigger Happy Havoc counterparts, and that the mysterious atmosphere suited Danganronpa well.
