= List of Danganronpa 3: The End of Hope's Peak High School episodes =

Cover art for the first Japanese Blu-ray box featuring the characters Makoto Naegi (left) and Kyoko Kirigiri (right)

Danganronpa 3: The End of Hope's Peak High School is a two-part anime television series produced by Lerche. The series is part of Spike Chunsoft's Danganronpa franchise and serves as a conclusion to the "Hope's Peak Academy" storyline featured in the video games Danganronpa: Trigger Happy Havoc, Danganronpa 2: Goodbye Despair, and Danganronpa Another Episode: Ultra Despair Girls. The series is divided into two parts that aired simultaneously: Future Arc, which aired in Japan between July 11, 2016, and September 26, 2016, and Despair Arc, which aired between July 14, 2016, and September 22, 2016, followed by a final episode, Hope Arc, which aired on September 29, 2016. Future Arc focuses on Makoto Naegi and his friends and their involvement in a killing game with the Future Foundation, and Despair Arc, focused on Hajime Hinata, a student and his involvement in experiments on humans. Both story arcs aired between July and September 2016, followed by a third, Hope Arc, finale that aired on September 29, 2016, concluding both arcs. An original video animation titled Super Danganronpa 2.5, set between Danganronpa 2 and Future Arc, was released with limited editions of Danganronpa V3: Killing Harmony on January 12, 2017.

For Future Arc, the opening theme is "Dead or Lie" by Maon Kurosaki and Trustrick, while the ending theme is "Recall the End" by Trustrick. For Despair Arc, the opening theme is "Kami-iro Awase" (カミイロアワセ; lit."Matching the Color of God") by Binaria, while the ending theme is "Zettai Kibō Birthday" (絶対希望バースデー; lit. 'Ultimate Hope Birthday') by Megumi Ogata. The ending theme for Hope Arc is "ever free" by hide with Spread Beaver. The series are licensed in North America by Funimation, who simulcast them in North America, the United Kingdom, and Ireland as they aired and streamed English dubs from August 10, 2016.

Both story arcs were released in a total of six DVDs and Blu-ray volumes released between September 28, 2016, and February 22, 2017. Four Blu-ray boxes were also released containing additional material. Another Blu-ray box containing the entire series was released on November 25, 2018, as well as one in celebration of the series' 10th anniversary.

Fumination released the English series in two Blu-ray sets on October 3, 2017 and re-released them as part of their essentials line on August 26, 2019, also in two sets. In Australia, Madman Entertainment licensed the series and released the series' home media release of the series on December 6, 2017. Animax Asia streamed the series in Southeast Asia.

== Episode list ==
=== Future Arc ===
No.	Title	Directed by	Written by	Original release date
1	"Third Time's the Charm"	Yu Kinome	Norimitsu Kaihō	July 11, 2016
Following the events of Danganronpa 2: Goodbye Despair, Makoto Naegi, the Ultimate Hope, and his fellow former classmates, detective Kyoko Kirigiri, swimmer Aoi Asahina, and fortune-teller Yasuhiro Hagakure, are brought together to an abandoned overseas branch of Hope's Peak Academy where the top members of the Future Foundation are assembled. Upon their arrival, vice-chairman Kyosuke Munakata places Makoto under arrest, accusing him of treason for harboring the Remnants of Despair; those who continued the evil desires of the Ultimate Despair, Junko Enoshima, following her death. Just then, the facility is attacked by a missile, cutting off all exits and trapping Yasuhiro outside, before a round of sleeping gas knocks everyone else unconscious. When they wake up, the members are greeted by the all-too-familiar visage of Monokuma, who announces that a new mutual killing game has begun before cheerfully revealing that housekeeper and former teacher Chisa Yukizome has already become the first victim.
2	"Hang the Witch"	Yasuhiro Minami	Norimitsu Kaiho	July 18, 2016
Monokuma reveals the rules of his new "Monokuma Hunter" game, in which each of the participants carry a bangle which, following a time limit, will put everyone to sleep for a short period of time. During this time, a designated attacker will awaken among them and kill one of the other participants, meaning they must try to determine who the true attacker is and kill them before they kill everyone else. Additionally, if anyone performs a personalised forbidden action, then they will be injected with a deadly poison. Therapist Miaya Gekkogahara attempts to hack Monokuma with her Usami program, but Monokuma hacks her right back and remodels Usami into Monomi like in Goodbye Despair. When boxer Juzo Sakakura starts acting violent against animator Ryota Mitarai, farmer Daisaku Bandai ends up triggering his forbidden action, witnessing violence by participants, and is killed by the poison in his bangle. As Kyosuke and Juzo accuse Makoto of being the traitor and attempt to kill him, wrestler Great Gozu stands against them and escapes with Makoto, Aoi, and Miaya. However, after everyone falls asleep following the second time limit, Makoto wakes up to discover Aoi apparently impaled with a knife.
3	"Cruel Violence and Hollow Words"	Yohei Fukui	Norimitsu Kaiho	July 25, 2016
Makoto is relieved yet annoyed to find Aoi's alleged stabbing was only a childish prank, only to discover the attacker had actually killed Great Gozu instead. Hoping to prevent any further killings, Makoto uses the intercom to communicate with the other participants, explaining how he tried to help the Remnants of Despair while also revealing his forbidden action, running in the halls, in order to win their trust. Meanwhile, pharmacist Seiko Kimura accuses sweetmaker Ruruka Ando of being the traitor, taking some drugs to transform herself and pursue Ruruka and blacksmith Sonosuke Izayoi. While Juzo goes after Kyoko, who is with Ryota and chairman Kazuo Tengan, Kyosuke, believing Makoto lacks the despair to make his words credible, attacks Makoto.
4	"Who is a Liar"	Nobu Ishida	Kiyomune Miwa	August 1, 2016
As Kyoko ends up spraining her ankle after Ryota lands on her, Kazuo manages to knock out Juzo when he lets his guard down. Meanwhile, Kyosuke manages to capture Makoto, announcing his intention to execute him in order to lure out the attacker. He explains to Makoto that he suspects the traitor may choose to end the killing game prematurely, frame one of the dead leaders for their crimes, and manipulate Makoto into destroying the Future Foundation from the inside, feeling everyone including himself should die in order to prevent this. While Kazuo confronts Kyosuke, helping Aoi and Miaya to escape with Makoto, Kyoko and Ryota, along with scoutman Koichi Kizakura, look over the corpses, pondering about the attacker's motives. Following a fierce battle, both Kyosuke and Kazuo end up falling off a walkway, and Kazuo is impaled on a piece of debris below. Meanwhile, as Juzo goes after Makoto and Aoi, it is revealed that Miaya is actually a robot being controlled by the former leader of the Warriors of Hope, Monaca Towa.
5	"Dreams of Distant Days"	Koichiro Kuroda	Kiyomune Miwa	August 8, 2016
Confronted by Sonosuke and Ruruka, Seiko recalls how her friendship with Ruruka soured over the years. Just as Ruruka is cornered, she deduces Seiko's forbidden action, letting someone step on her shadow. Meanwhile, Kazuo, whose forbidden action forces him to answer questions truthfully, tells Kyosuke the identity of the attacker, taking his eye out before he kills him. When Yasuhiro, stuck outside of the building following the initial attack, is attacked by a helicopter, the explosion reveals a hidden secret entrance which Sonosuke discovers. Rejecting Ruruka's offer to kill Kyosuke in exchange for her life, Seiko takes more drugs and destroys all the lights in the room, but her pursuit is stopped when she gets knocked out by Miaya's weapons. Regretting that she could not save anyone, Seiko is killed by the attacker during the third time limit.
6	"No Man is an Island"	Fumio Ito	Norimitsu Kaiho	August 15, 2016
After analyzing Great Gozu's body, Kyoko's group discover that, along with Seiko, Sonosuke has also been killed with a knife to the chest, soon coming across a frightened Ruruka. Meanwhile, Makoto realises that the game's rules do not actually prohibit anyone from escaping, managing to get in contact with classmate, heir Byakuya Togami, to tell them about Monokuma's killing game. Byakuya informs Makoto that, along with the fact the killing game is not being broadcast like Monokuma said, Kyosuke has declared an assault on Jabberwock Island, where the recovered Remnants of Despair are. Hiding the fact that the real Miaya Gekkogahara is actually dead, Byakuya, believing Monaca to be the mastermind, calls upon the assistance of Makoto's sister Komaru and former classmate, writer Toko Fukawa / Genocide Jill in Towa City to search for her, while he himself sets off to rescue the captured Future Foundation members. Meanwhile, a fleet of battleships rapidly approach Jabberwock Island, where Hajime Hinata -- who is still carrying the red eye of his former Izuru Kamukura persona -- indifferently awaits.
7	"Ultra Despair Girls"	Yohei Fukui	Yuichiro Higashide	August 22, 2016
Receiving help from the former Warriors of Hope, Komaru and Toko, along with the latter's psychotic alter-ego, serial killer Genocider Sho, make their way to Monaca's hideout. Upon confronting Monaca, the girls are surprised to discover that Monaca has suddenly given up on despair. Revealing that she has had no involvement in the killing game outside of replacing Miaya with a robot and faking Aoi's death for her own amusement, Monaca leaves behind some disturbing words about Makoto before launching herself into space to become a NEET. Afterwards, Komaru contacts Makoto and Aoi through the Miaya robot, relaying Monaca's warning that one of the original survivors of Hope's Peak Academy's school of mutual killing will allegedly die because of Makoto.
8	"Who Killed Cock Robin?"	Yasuhiro Minami	Ryo Morise	August 29, 2016
As Byakuya arrives at the facility, managing to take out the helicopter that was pursuing Yasuhiro, the Miaya robot switches to automatic control and goes up against Kyosuke. Meanwhile, as Juzo prepares to attack Kyoko, Koichi, deducing that Juzo's forbidden action prevents him from punching anyone, lures him into a floor activated trap. Just then, Ruruka collapses the floor underneath Kyoko, prompting Koichi to break his forbidden action; opening his left hand, in order to save her, dying from his bangle's poison as a result. After Ruruka fails to put Juzo under control with her sweets, Kyoko deduces that Ruruka is the one who killed Sonosuke, who actually died from his bangle's poison after eating one of her sweets. Kyoko then reveals the secret exit Sonosuke had found, deducing that Ruruka had killed Sonosuke to prevent him from triggering her own forbidden action; letting anyone leave the game area. Just as Byakuya manages to break into the facility, he and his team inadvertently set off a bomb that causes the facility to start collapsing.
9	"You Are My Reason to Die"	Yu Kinome	Kiyomune Miwa	September 5, 2016
The secret exit turns out to be a dead end, with Kyoko revealing that the game area is actually taking place in an identical facility located underwater. After destroying the Miaya robot and retrieving a data module containing information on everyone's forbidden actions, Kyosuke suddenly and unexpectedly turns against Juzo and stabs him with his sword. Meanwhile, Makoto and Aoi meet up with Kyoko and Ryota to discuss the situation before they are put to sleep by the next time limit, during which Ruruka is killed by the attacker. Upon waking up, however, Makoto and the others are shocked to discover that Kyoko has been poisoned by her forbidden action, set to go off if Makoto survived past the fourth time limit. Just then, Kyosuke calls out Makoto to settle once and for all whose hope is more righteous.
10	"Death, Destruction, Despair"	Kazuma Sato	Norimitsu Kaiho	September 12, 2016
Realising that Kyoko kept quiet about her forbidden action so that he could keep on living, Makoto leaves Aoi and Ryota with Kyoko as he sets off to confront Kyosuke. Kyosuke begins hunting Makoto throughout the facility, overcoming every trap that Makoto sets up for him. Taking advantage of Kyosuke's forbidden action, opening doors, Makoto manages to lure Kyosuke into a locked room where killing him would leave him trapped, giving them the opportunity to talk. Kyosuke reveals Kazuo's final message that the attacker is not merely one person, but in fact all of the Future Foundation members participating in the game, presenting evidence he found proving that Chisa was a Remnant of Despair herself. Despite hearing this, Makoto states that even if everyone were Remnants of Despair, he would still feel glad to have met Kyoko, leading Kyosuke to realise just how much he cared for Chisa. As Kyosuke loses his will to keep fighting, Aoi appears with Kyoko's notebook, which allegedly reveals who the true attacker is. Meanwhile, at Jabberwock Island, a single ship sneaks past the Future Foundation blockade around the island.
11	"All Good Things"	Masaru Kanamori	Ryo Morise	September 19, 2016
Kyoko's notes reveal that everyone who was allegedly killed by the attacker had actually committed suicide, with all of their deaths taking place in rooms with monitors. In order to test this hypothesis, Makoto has the others tie him up in front of a monitor before the next time limit. While the others sleep safely in another room, Makoto is awoken by a recording of Monokuma and shown a subliminal video that drives him crazy with visions of all of his dead classmates and friends. Just as Makoto is brought to the brink of despair and prepares to kill himself, he is stopped by a frantic Juzo, who had cut off his own hand along with his bangle in order to observe the attacker. Learning what Makoto had discovered about the attacker, Juzo declines to return to the others with him, feeling guilty for betraying Kyosuke after being blackmailed by Junko. Juzo further reveals that he previously hated Makoto for being the one to defeat Junko, denying him his own chance to exact revenge on her. After Makoto reports his findings, Kyosuke tells the others that the game was likely set up by Kazuo, believing he was one of the Remnants of Despair and noting that only he could have tampered with the monitors. Using the last of his strength, Juzo brings himself to the power room to shut off power in the vicinity and disable the monitors and bangles, bleeding to death by the time Kyosuke finds him. Meanwhile, as Ryota is confronted by Makoto over the techniques used in Monokuma's video, he receives a message on his phone from Kazuo.
12	"It Is Always Darkest"	Yohei Fukui	Norimitsu Kaiho	September 26, 2016
Kazuo's message contains a video revealing that he was the mastermind behind the killing game. Refusing to run away anymore, Ryota explains how Junko had used his brainwashing techniques to create a despair video that hypnotises people into becoming Remnants of Despair. With his forbidden action no longer preventing him from using his talent, Ryota announces his intentions to broadcast a "hope video" that will brainwash everyone in the world into following hope, using it to temporarily control Aoi and have her hold back Makoto while he escapes. Makoto soon comes to the realisation that Kazuo was not actually a Remnant of Despair and had only initiated the killing game to coerce Ryota into using his hope video, never intending for him to be a participant. The group realizes that a world consumed by hope would be no better than one consumed by despair and resolve to stop Ryota. They are attacked by a team of soldiers brainwashed by Ryota; Kyosuke battles the soldiers to buy the others time, Aoi is shot and forced to remain behind, and Makoto is cornered by the soldiers. As Ryota prepares his video for worldwide broadcast, Makoto is rescued by Byakuya and Yasuhiro, while Hajime arrives and begins to make his move.

=== Despair Arc ===
No.	Title	Directed by	Written by	Animation director	Original release date
1	"Hello Again, Hope's Peak High School"; Transliteration: "Tadaima Kibōgamine Gakuen" (Japanese: ただいま希望ヶ峰学園)	Yu Kinome	Ukyō Kodachi	Yumenosuke Tokuda, Keiko Kurosawa	July 14, 2016
Having just graduated herself, Chisa Yukizome is assigned as assistant homeroom teacher of Hope's Peak Academy's 77th class. Noticing only a few of her students showing up to class, Chisa decides to drag them across the school to gather their tardy classmates. Meanwhile, Hajime Hinata, a student from Hope's Peak's Reserve Course, meets gamer Chiaki Nanami, who offers some relief to his fears of not having a talent like the main class.
2	"My Impurest Heart for You"; Transliteration: "Shita Gokoro o Kimi ni" (Japanese: したごころを君に)	Taichi Shinko	Ukyō Kodachi	Yumenosuke Tokuda	July 21, 2016
As Chisa continues her duties as a teacher while secretly serving as a spy for Kyosuke, Hajime speaks with Kazuo, who warns him against accepting a certain offer from the school. After receiving some advice from Chisa, Chiaki brings in some multiplayer video games to make friends with the rest of the class. Things soon take a turn for the weird when dancer Hiyoko Saionji spikes everyone's food with an aphrodisiac that cook Teruteru Hanamura made. Luckily, Chiaki manages to step in to protect Hiyoko from a rampant Teruteru before things go too far. As Chiaki is nominated as the class representative, Natsumi Kuzuryu, the younger sister of gangster Fuyuhiko Kuzuryu, transfers into Hajime's class.
3	"A Farewell to All Futures"; Transliteration: "Subete no Mirai ni Sayonara o" (Japanese: 全ての未来にさよならを)	Koichiro Kurosawa	Yuichiro Higashide	Ippei Watanabe	July 28, 2016
Natsumi's pompous attitude gets her in an argument with Sato, the friend of photographer Mahiru Koizumi, leading to some serious threats between the two. Hajime attempts to pass along Chiaki's advice that there's more to life than talent, but Natsumi refuses to listen, stating that she wants to have talent so she can stand alongside her brother. The next day, Hajime arrives at school to discover that Natsumi has been murdered, while Sato, who he suspected may have been the one responsible, is found dead a few days later. Hajime tries to go to the main building to confront Mahiru over what happened, but is stopped by Juzo, who insults his lack of talent and beats him up until Chisa breaks up the fight. As Chisa and Juzo grow concerned about the higher-ups covering up the two deaths, Hajime, left scorned by the whole experience, undergoes an experiment to be injected with an artificial talent.
4	"The Melancholy, Surprise, and Disappearance of Nagito Komaeda"; Transliteration: "Komaeda Nagito no Yūutsu to Kyōgaku to Shōshitsu" (Japanese: 狛枝凪斗の憂鬱と驚愕と消失)	Noriyuki Noya	Ryo Morise	Keiko Kurosawa	August 4, 2016
With the class preparing for a practical exam, lucky student Nagito Komaeda, noticing the gloominess of his classmates following the recent deaths, approaches Seiko for a laxative he can use to postpone the exam. At the same time, Ruruka asks Seiko for a performance enhancing drug to use in her pastries for the exam. However, Nagito gets the two drugs mixed up, later accidentally getting his bag switched with Seiko's. As a result, Ruruka ends up using laxative in her sweets during her exam while Seiko finds herself with a switch to a bomb Nagito was planning to set off, leading the two to distrust each other. Elsewhere, the drug Nagito picked ends up causing a dog to grow in size and break into the gymnasium, causing the bomb to be accidentally set off. Following the chaos, Seiko, Ruruka, and Sonosuke are all expelled, Nagito is suspended, and Chisa is reassigned to the Reserve Course. Though this development makes her mission to spy on the Reserve Course easier, Chisa is reluctant to leave her class behind and entrusts their welfare to Chiaki.
5	"Beginning of the End"; Transliteration: "Owari no Hajimari" (Japanese: 終わりの始まり)	Takashi Ogawara	Ukyo Kodachi	Junpei Matsumoto, Hiromi Higuchi, Aya Higami, Misaki Kaneko	August 11, 2016
After spending half a year teaching the Reserve Course, Chisa asks Juzo for a trustee's ID in order to investigate something known as the Kamukura Project. Managing to return to her position as homeroom teacher of the 77th class, she is relieved to find that Chiaki has managed to keep everyone together and is given a warm welcome. Meanwhile, it is revealed that Ryota has been spending all of his time at home animating, having the Ultimate Impostor take his place in class. Elsewhere, fashionista Junko Enoshima meets up with her sister, fighter Mukuro Ikusaba, as they prepare to enroll into Hope's Peak as part of the 78th class. When Ryota ends up collapsing with a fever, the Ultimate Impostor seeks out nurse Mikan Tsumiki to treat him, explaining how he took on Ryota's identity so that he could stay at home and work on an anime that will save the world. As the new school year begins and the 78th class begin their life at Hope's Peak, Hajime goes through with the Kamukura Project.
6	"A Despairfully Fateful Encounter"; Transliteration: "Zetsubō-teki ni Unmei-teki na Deai" (Japanese: 絶望的に運命的な出会い)	Daisuke Nakajima	Yuichiro Higashide	Minoru Tanaka, Yoshihiro Maeda, Misaki Kaneko, Aya Higami, Masumi Hoshino	August 18, 2016
With his original personality removed and his body infused with every known talent, Hajime emerges from the experiment under the new persona of Izuru Kamukura. Later, after the 77th class move into a new building, Chisa sneaks into the trustee's office, where she learns all about the Kamukura Project, which is designed to create an Ultimate Hope. Meanwhile, Junko and Mukuro kidnap one of the trustees and learn about the project as well, using the trustee's eyeball to sneak into where Izuru is being held. Revealed to be an Ultimate Analyst who can analyse anything, Junko tries to sway him over to the side of despair, which cannot be predicted. After getting knocked out by Izuru, who leaves a message that he will be waiting for her, Junko becomes excited when she encounters Ryota, declaring their meeting to be another "fateful encounter".
7	"The Biggest, Most Atrocious Incident in Hope's Peak High School's History"; Transliteration: "Kibōgamine Gakuen Shijō Saidai Saiaku no Jiken" (Japanese: 希望ヶ峰学園史上最大最悪の事件)	Eiichi Kuboyama	Yoichiro Koizumi	Keiko Kurosawa, Yoshimi Agata	August 25, 2016
Junko gets Ryota to show her the anime he has been working on, learning that various techniques akin to subliminal messaging are used to prompt emotions from its viewers. Concerned by his absence, the Ultimate Impostor sends Mikan to check on Ryota's dorm, where she is captured by Mukuro and brought to a secret room where Junko is having Ryota continue work on his anime. Later that night, Junko and Mukuro break Izuru out of his facility and take him to the old Hope's Peak Academy school building, where they coerce the school's student council into killing each other. As principal Jin Kirigiri is ordered to cover up the incident, Junko leaks information about the experiments and murders to the Reserve Course students, sparking a rebellion against the main school.
8	"The Worst Reunion by Chance"; Transliteration: "Gūzen ni Mo Saiaku na Saikai" (Japanese: 偶然にも最悪な再会)	Noriyuki Noya	Ukyo Kodachi	Yoshimi Agata	September 1, 2016
After noticing that Mikan has been acting strangely around Junko, Ryota is shocked to discover a video of the student council's killing game. Junko reveals that she plans to combine this video with Ryota's anime to create something that will brainwash people and send them into despair, threatening to subject his classmates to another killing game should he refuse to cooperate. Meanwhile, as Kyosuke arrives to help deal with the Reserve Course riots, Nagito, who has returned from his long absence, mentions that he has seen Mikan on the school grounds, prompting the rest of the class to go off in search for her. During their search, Nagito leads Chiaki to the secret room where Junko and Ryota are, having swordswoman Peko Pekoyama hold off Mukuro. Nagito attempts to shoot Junko but is stopped by Izuru, who Chiaki recognises as Hajime, while Ryota escapes and runs into Chisa, who rushes towards the scene.
9	"Chisa Yukizome Doesn't Smile"; Transliteration: "Yukizome Chisa wa Warawanai" (Japanese: 雪染ちさは笑わない)	Kenzo Ogata	Yoichiro Koizumi	Takami Yanagi	September 8, 2016
Chisa shows up to confront Junko, who reveals her plan to brainwash her class into Ultimate Despair, showing its effectiveness by having a student kill himself on command. Meanwhile, Chiaki escapes with Nagito and informs the rest of the class, who decide to go help their teacher. While Chisa is forced to watch Junko's video of despair while Mukuro tinkers with her brain, Junko brags about her plan to Ryota, who can do nothing but flee in shame, before she is confronted by Juzo. As the class arrive at Junko's hideout, Mikan pushes Chiaki through a hidden passageway, where she reunites with Chisa, unaware of what has happened to her.
10	"Smile At Despair in the Name of Hope"; Transliteration: "Kimi wa Kibō to Iu Na no Zetsubō ni Hohoemu" (Japanese: 君は希望という名の絶望に微笑む)	Yusuke Kamada	Ukyo Kodachi	Keiko Kurosawa	September 15, 2016
Junko overpowers Juzo and deduces that he is in love with Kyosuke, threatening to expose his feelings unless he betrays Kyosuke by reporting that she is innocent. Meanwhile, Chisa, who has been brainwashed by Junko's despair video, sends Chiaki down to an underground room where she is captured by Junko. Deciding that Chiaki is the final element needed to finish her prototype, Junko forces her to go through a dungeon filled with deadly traps, while the rest of the class are forced to watch as she struggles in vain and is ultimately fatally wounded by spikes. The resulting despair, combined with Junko's brainwashing methods, warps the students and transforms them into the Remnants of Despair. In her final moments, Chiaki tries to remind Izuru of the person he once was before passing away, leading Izuru to shed tears for the first time since his transformation.
11	"Goodbye, Hope's Peak High School"; Transliteration: "Sayonara Kibōgamine Gakuen" (Japanese: さよなら希望ヶ峰学園)	Noriyuki Noya	Ukyo Kodachi	Aya Higami	September 22, 2016
The blackmailed Juzo and the brainwashed Chisa both tell Kyosuke that Junko is innocent, allowing her plan to continue unhindered. As the 77th class graduate from their classroom to spread despair across the world, the Reserve Course students storm the main building and kill everyone inside before Junko uses her despair video to have them all commit suicide. Meanwhile, Izuru decides to have his memories of the 77th Class erased and vice versa, interested to see if hope can be more unpredictable than despair. In order to protect the remaining students in the 78th class, Jin helps them convert the school's old building into a shelter, unaware of the two Despairs who lurk among them. As Junko moves onto the next phase of her plan, becoming curious about the wildly unpredictable luck exhibited by Makoto, Chisa rejoins Kyosuke, who is unaware of her transformation into despair. Some time later, in a virtual world, another meeting between Hajime Hinata and Chiaki Nanami takes place.

=== Hope Arc ===
No.	Title	Directed by	Written by	Animation director	Original release date
1	"The School of Hope and the Students of Despair"; Transliteration: "Kibō no Gakuen to Zetsubō no Kōkōsei" (Japanese: 希望の学園と絶望の高校生)	Yu Kinome	Norimitsu Kaiho	Keiko Kurosawa	September 29, 2016
As Makoto races to stop Ryota from broadcasting his Hope video, he and the others are assisted by the arrival of the 77th Class, who Hajime managed to restore to normal using Izuru's talents. After making their way past a hypnotised task force, Hajime and the others confront Ryota, who blames himself for the entire incident. Feeling that he should not have to carry his burden alone, Hajime and the others ask Ryota to come with them as they aim to atone for their sins, convincing him to cancel the broadcast. Afterward, Hajime and the others claim responsibility for the killing game, shifting blame from the Future Foundation, before setting off with Ryota towards a new future. Meanwhile, as Kyosuke leaves Makoto in charge of bringing hope to the world as he goes off to shoulder his own burden, it is revealed that Kyoko had managed to survive her poisoning thanks to an antidote that Seiko had made. A few months later, the former Ultimate students get together to rebuild Hope's Peak Academy, with Makoto serving as its headmaster.

=== Original video animation ===
No.	Title	Original release date
OVA	"Super Danganronpa 2.5: Nagito Komaeda and the Destroyer of Worlds"; Transliteration: "Sūpā Danganronpa 2.5: Komaeda Nagito to Sekai no Hakaisha" (Japanese: スーパーダンガンロンパ2.5 狛枝凪斗と世界の破壊者)	January 12, 2017
Nagito lives a content school life with his classmates, satisfied with not standing out with a talent so long as everyone lives in happiness. While Nagito gives Kazuichi encouragement for a date with Sonia, Izuru appears out of thin air, aiming to destroy the world. The next day, Kazuichi is found dead, allegedly murdered, prompting Fuyuhiko, Sonia, and Peko to search for his killer, soon coming up against Izuru. Calling himself the "destroyer of worlds", Izuru kills the three of them and calls Nagito to confront him. Relying on his extreme luck, Nagito attempts to collapse the building on top of Izuru before killing himself. Afterward, it is revealed that Nagito was actually trapped in an illusion following his virtual death in the New World Program, with Izuru being an Alter Ego sent to dive into the program and restore the psyches of those who had become Remnants of Despair. Reawakening in the real world and reuniting with Hajime, Nagito and his revived classmates set off to rescue the Future Foundation.

== DVDs and Blu-ray ==
=== Original release ===
Name	Date	Discs	Episodes
Future, Volume 1	September 28, 2016	1	1–2
Despair, Volume 1	September 28, 2016	1	1–2
Future, Volume 2	October 26, 2016	1	3–4
Despair, Volume 2	October 26, 2016	1	3–4
Future, Volume 3	November 25, 2016	1	5–6
Despair, Volume 3	November 25, 2016	1	5–6
Future, Volume 4	December 21, 2016	1	7–8
Despair, Volume 4	December 21, 2016	1	7–8
Future, Volume 5	January 25, 2017	1	9–10
Despair, Volume 5	January 25, 2017	1	9–10
Future, Volume 6	February 22, 2017	1	11-12
Despair, Volume 6		1	11-12

Blu-ray boxes

Name	Date	Discs	Episodes
Volume 1	September 28, 2016	1	Future 1–3, Despair 1–3
Volume 2	October 26, 2016	1	Future 4–6, Despair 4–6
Volume 3	November 25, 2016	1	7–9
Volume 4	December 21, 2016	1	Future 10–12, Despair 10–11, Hope
Compilation	November 25, 2018	1	1-12
10th Anniversary Box	November 25, 2020	1	1-12

=== English release ===
First release

Name	Date	Discs	Episodes
Future	October 3, 2017	1	1–12
Despair	October 3, 2017	1	1–11

Essentials re-release

Name	Date	Discs	Episodes
Future	August 26, 2019	1	1–12
Despair	August 26, 2019	1	1–11
