= Danganronpa 3: The End of Hope's Peak High School =

Japanese anime television series

- Cover for Future (left, featuring Makoto Naegi) and Despair (featuring Hajime Hinata)

ダンガンロンパ3 –The End of 希望ヶ峰学園– (Danganronpa 3: Ji Endo obu Kibōgamine Gakuen)
- Genre: Mystery, horror
- Created by: Spike Chunsoft
- Anime television series
- Directed by: Seiji Kishi (chief); Daiki Fukuoka
- Written by: Norimitsu Kaihō
- Music by: Masafumi Takada
- Studio: Lerche
- Licensed by: Crunchyroll
- Original network: Tokyo MX, BS11, AT-X
- English network: SEA: Animax Asia
- Original run: July 11, 2016 – September 29, 2016
- Episodes: 24
- Original video animation

Super Danganronpa 2.5: Komaeda Nagito to Sekai no Hakaisha
- Directed by: Seiji Kishi (chief); Daiki Fukuoka
- Written by: Norimitsu Kaihō
- Studio: Lerche
- Released: January 12, 2017
- Runtime: 25 minutes

Danganronpa 3: The End of Hope's Peak High School (Note: Japanese: ダンガンロンパ3 –The End of 希望ヶ峰学園–, Hepburn: Danganronpa Surī: Ji Endo obu Kibōgamine Gakuen; lit. 'Danganronpa Three: The End of Hope's Peak High School') is a mystery horror anime television series produced by Lerche, directed by Daiki Fukuoka, and supervised by Seiji Kishi. The anime is the second animated series based on Spike Chunsoft's Danganronpa video game franchise, and serves as a conclusion to the "Hope's Peak Academy" (Note: Japanese: 希望ヶ峰学園, Hepburn: Kibōgamine Gakuen) arc established in the previously released games Danganronpa: Trigger Happy Havoc (2010) and Danganronpa 2: Goodbye Despair (2012) in lieu of a game. The series is divided into three parts. Future Arc (Note: Japanese: 未来編, Hepburn: Mirai-hen) focuses on Makoto Naegi and his friends and their involvement in a killing game with the Future Foundation; and Despair Arc (Note: Japanese: 絶望編, Hepburn: Zetsubō-hen) focuses on Hajime Hinata, a student, and his involvement in experiments on humans. The first two-story arcs aired between July and September 2016. They were followed by Hope Arc, (Note: Japanese: 希望編, Hepburn: Kibō-hen) the conclusion to both previous arcs, which aired on September 29, 2016.

Writer Kazutaka Kodaka conceived the project. He aimed to create an original storyline that would not work as another video game, unlike previous works from the franchise. Despite the dark narrative, Kodaka wanted to give the anime a proper conclusion through the one-episode finale, Hope Arc, despite being accused of pandering to the base because he intended to give it a happy ending. He and his team, working on a television series for the first time, found the project challenging. A spin-off manga, Danganronpa Gaiden: Killer Killer, was serialized in Kodansha's Bessatsu Shōnen Magazine between March 2016 and May 2017. Funimation, Madman Entertainment, and Animax Asia licensed the three parts for English-speaking regions.

Critics felt that The End of Hope's Peak High School was an attractive anime sequel to the video games, based on the casting. The returning cast from the games was regarded as likeable. Future Arc and Despair Arc were the subjects of mixed reviews because, rather than the original run of the series in Japan where they aired together, Funimation marketed them separately. Some critics felt that the narrative was far darker than the video games, to the point it was hard to become attached to the new cast or returning members who die in the story. The Hope Arc finale earned positive responses for closing Makoto's and Hajime's stories. The series is often listed as one of the best from 2016.

== Plot ==
The story is split into two alternately airing chapters; Future Arc and Despair Arc, followed by a finale called Hope Arc.

=== Future Arc ===
Future Arc takes place after the events of the video game Danganronpa 2: Goodbye Despair. Lucky Student Makoto Naegi is placed under arrest by vice-chairman and former Student Council President Kyosuke Munakata of the Future Foundation. Makoto is accused of treason and kidnapping for hiding Hajime, Nagito, and Housekeeper Chisa Yukizome's other students in a virtual world after they continued fulfilling Junko's evil desires following her death, although Makoto aimed to eliminate their memories of their brainwashed forms. However, a bear-like creature named Monokuma appears on video monitors and starts a "Monokuma Hunter" killing game. Each of the participants carries a bangle, which after a time will put everyone to sleep for a short period. During this sleep period, a designated attacker will awaken among them and kill one of the other participants. Chisa is the first victim, resulting in Kyosuke distrusting most of his allies and attempting to kill Makoto.

In addition, if anyone performs a personalized forbidden action, they will be injected with a deadly poison. One by one, members of the Future Foundation began to die in mysterious circumstances: Farmer Daisaku Bandai, Blacksmith Sonosuke Izayoi, and Talent Scout Koichi Kizakura are poisoned for violating their forbidden actions, former Hope's Peak Headmaster and chairman of the Future Foundation Kazuo Tengan and a robotic copy of Psychologist Miaya Gekkogahara are killed by Kyosuke protecting Makoto, and Wrestler Great Gozu, Pharmacist Seiko Kimura, and Confectioner Ruruka Ando are killed by the attacker. Makoto's group is shocked to discover that Detective Kyoko Kirigiri has been poisoned for her forbidden action: Makoto surviving past the fourth time limit. Makoto sets off to confront Kyosuke, but the two make peace as Makoto gets his superior to remember Chisa's death. Understanding the attacker's modus operandi, with Boxer Juzo Sakakura's help Makoto learns that there is no attacker; the people committed suicide after being brainwashed by Junko's hallucinating Despair videos that were originally used to brainwash Chisa's students. Juzo destroys all the monitors but dies of blood loss after being wounded by Kyosuke, who thought Juzo was the traitor. Makoto soon realizes that Kazuo was the mastermind behind the killing game and was manipulating Animator Ryota Mitarai into thinking he fell into despair so he would unleash his own Hope brainwashing video to be released onto mankind, which he escapes from the facility and intends to do so at the protests of Makoto and his friends. In the final scene, the spirits of the late Junko and Chisa watch the events unfold in the afterlife (taking the form of a movie theater) as they wonder if the surviving characters can stop Ryota.

=== Despair Arc ===
Despair, which takes place prior to the events of Danganronpa: Trigger Happy Havoc, opens with Chisa, who begins her job teaching Hope's Peak Academy's 77th Class of Super High School Level students, who stand out as talented in different ways. She is teaching in order to help Kyosuke and Juzo improve the establishment. Meanwhile, Hajime Hinata, a student in the school's Reserve Course for those without talent, prepares to undergo an experiment to make him the Ultimate Hope. He has developed an inferiority complex over his lack of talents, despite bonding with Gamer Chiaki Nanami, a talented student.

After spending half a year teaching the Reserve Course, Chisa asks Juzo for a trustee's ID in order to investigate the Kamukura Project. The now amnesia-ridden Hinata, referred to as Izuru Kamukura, meets Junko and her sister, Soldier Mukuro Ikusaba. Junko brainwashes Chisa and blackmails Juzo, threatening to reveal his crush on Kyosuke. Juzo and the now-brainwashed Chisa tell Kyosuke that Junko is innocent, allowing Junko's plan to continue unhindered. Using Izuru as bait, Junko kills Chiaki while brainwashing Chisa's students, the 77th Class graduates. The brainwashing is accomplished by screening a film of Chiaki's death, which contains subliminal messages created by an unwitting Ryota. Meanwhile, Izuru decides to have his memories of the 77th Class erased, as he is interested to see if hope can be more unpredictable than despair. To protect the remaining students in the 78th Class, Principal Jin Kirigiri helps them convert the school's old building into a shelter, unaware of the two Despairs who lurk among them. As Junko moves on to the next phase of her plan, becoming curious about the wildly unpredictable luck exhibited by Makoto, Chisa rejoins Kyosuke, who is unaware of Chisa's being brainwashed. Some time later, in a virtual world, Izuru finds himself, in his Hajime persona, interacting with Chiaki.

=== Hope Arc ===
In the Hope Arc, Makoto races to stop Ryota from broadcasting his brainwashing video. He and the others are assisted by the arrival of the 77th Class, which Hajime, using his talents, managed to restore to normal. Feeling that he should not have to carry his burden alone, Hajime and the others ask Ryota to come with them, as they aim to atone for their sins. They convince Ryota to cancel his broadcast. Afterward, Hajime and the others claim responsibility for the killing game, shifting blame from the Future Foundation. Meanwhile, Kyosuke leaves Makoto on friendly terms. As they leave, Nurse Mikan Tsumiki, says that she was able to heal a person poisoned by their bangle who managed to survive thanks to an antidote created by Seiko. The final scene moves to a rebuilt Hope's Peak Academy, where Kyoko is revealed to be the one who survived, referring to Makoto as the school's new headmaster.

== Production ==
=== Conception ===
The series was the final chapter of the "Hope's Peak Academy" arc within the Danganronpa franchise, as the third main video game, Danganronpa V3: Killing Harmony, focuses on a new setting and group of characters, in contrast to the anime, which instead focuses on returning characters.

The Danganronpa development staff said that, while it was difficult to work on both titles simultaneously, they recognized that the opportunity to do something like it does not come along often. Initially, an anime adaptation of Danganronpa 2: Goodbye Despair had been planned; but in the end the development staff opted to make an anime that takes place after Danganronpa 2. Danganronpa head writer Kazutaka Kodaka felt that the Danganronpa 2 characters' story had ended within that game and that he could not easily write about what happened to them afterward. While a story of the class trials had originally been considered, the feeling was that it would have been too painful for the characters. This led to the decision to turn the conclusion into an anime. According to Kodaka, the series would feature content that can only be expressed in an animated medium. The production staff wanted to make the series suspenseful, even though it did not include any investigations.

Kodaka aimed to create a unique style of storytelling. Rather than making a fan service anime, he wanted to have a more distinctive narrative. He said that some fans called the idea of a happy ending pandering, but the writer said he wanted to give proper endings. That is how Kodaka had the idea of creating the third story arc, Hope Arc, to bring closure to the dark story but in a lighthearted way. A producer from Lerche inspired him to do the work. Kodaka wanted to reduce the amount of action from that in the previous works and, instead, to create a psychological struggle based on the trials presented by the new killing game. He believed that, while any newcomers would understand the Future Arc, the Despair Arc needed knowledge of Danganronpa 2: Goodbye Despair to be understood. As a result, the writer separated Makoto's group from Hajime's using two story arcs. Makoto's storytelling and themes are those of hope, in contrast to Hajime's theme of despair.

According to director Seiji Kishi, Rui Komatsuzaki redesigned Makoto and his friends to look more mature. To attract more fans, Kishi had the idea that Makoto's first image as an adult would show him handcuffed. While acknowledging that the cast had aged, the anime staff claimed that new characters with similar traits would be further explored in it. Kishi expressed shock at Kodaka's idea of his being put in charge of the series. He claimed the idea of ending the game's story as an anime was unique. Kodaka said he wanted the anime to appeal to fans of the previous games. In order to distance the anime from the other Danganronpa game that was also the third installment, the game was titled Danganronpa V3: Killing Harmony. The original cast in the games returned with Nobuyo Oyama (Monokuma) looking forward to getting people's attention.

In contrast to his work on Danganronpa: The Animation, where he was the director, Kishi took on the role of chief director, leaving him with less work. Kishi contrasted his work with the anime adaptations of Persona, where he was involved, with those of Danganronpa. He felt that the Persona series used more substories that needed to be adapted, in contrast to the more linear narrative style employed by Kodaka. While Kodaka planned the original plot, former Nitroplus writer Norimitsu Kaihō was in charge of revising the scripts to adapt them into the anime series. Lerche chose Kaihō to write the anime, based on his knowledge of the franchise.

=== Writing ===
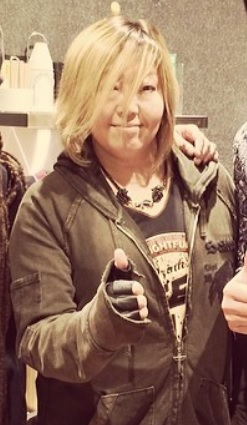
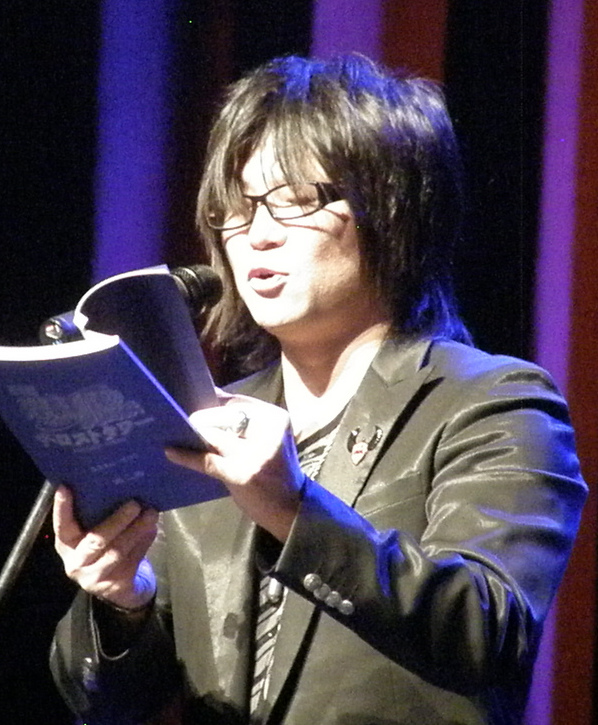
The work of the actors Megumi Ogata (left) and Toshiyuki Morikawa (right) moved Kodaka for their respective deliveries as Makoto Naegi and Kyosuke Munakata.

The idea of dividing the series into two arcs allowed further exploitation of the concept of the mystery genre the games are known for. Kodaka suggested that, like the games, rewatching the anime would provide a different point of view of the series' nature. For example, the cast of Goodbye Despair is described as video game characters competing against each other in Monokuma's game, while the Future Arc would leave the impression, by the way the narrative is handled, that the cast are also anime characters. Compared to Goodbye Despair, Kodaka wanted the cast to differ from that in Despair. This resulted in Hajime being written as having a more hateful manner, because of his lack of talents, until he met Chiaki Nanami. Chiaki was written to emphasize that she is not the same heroine from Goodbye Despair. In it she is an artificial intelligence based on the real Chiaki who is killed by Junko. Nevertheless, Hajime's meeting with the real Chiaki was made an integral part of the narrative, based on how they bond when playing games. Meanwhile, Nagito Komaeda was written in a more lighthearted manner, which was easy for fans to spot.

In describing the cast, the writer said the anime helped to compare Hajime with his alter-ego Izuru Kamukura, whose characters saw little development in the game. Izuru was described as a god-like entity, while Hajime was deemed a superior entity because he expressed more human qualities. He expressed doubts about Junko Enoshima, whom he deems his strongest villain. Lerche's handling of the brief encounter between Izuru and Nagito earned recognition from the original creator, based on how both characters possess similar talents. While returning from Goodbye Despair, a character only known as "Ultimate Imposter" was revised, as in the original game he impersonated Byakuya Togami. As a result, Imposter became more developed as he showed his own identity and concern when looking after Ryota Mitarai, whom Kodaka referred to as a tragic character, due to how Junko manipulates him to steal his subliminal techniques. Junko and Mukuro's actress, Megumi Toyoguchi, claimed it was difficult to voice the Despair Sisters, not only for having to do two characters but also because of Junko's multiple changes of mood.

In regards to Makoto, his relationship with Kyoko Kirigiri was written to evoke a more intimate tone than in the original game. Kodaka carefully accomplished this through a scene where Kyoko takes off her gloves for the first time in the series, in order to comfort Makoto. This was also meant to be a parallel to the romantic relationship between two other characters from the same series, Kyosuke Munakata and Chisa Yukizome, who are also implicitly involved romantically. Although Chisa dies in the first episode of Future Arc, she was written to give an impression of her personality, in order to leave her intact in Despair Arc, where she was still alive. Mai Nakahara's performance gained a positive response from the staff. Similarly, Kyosuke briefly appears in the Despair Arc, but his calm demeanor was changed for Future Arc, showing the impact Chisa's death had on him. Juzo was created to be an object of viewers' hatred, for his violent actions towards both Makoto and Hajime, but the revelation of his one-sided feelings for Kyosuke was meant to show a more sensitive side. Based on his early sketches, Komatasuzaki wanted Juzo to be handsome.

Kodaka originally intended for Kyosuke to die protecting Makoto. With the writing staff originally seeing Munakata as content to die, this idea was scrapped in favor of Kyosuke seeking redemption. This was done to have Makoto move forward carrying the burden of hope, Hajime to move forward carrying the burden of despair, and Kyosuke to move forward carrying the burden of his dead friends. The original plan was to tell what happens to many characters after the Hope Arc as the credits roll, but that was cut for length. Animation producer Yuuji Higa said it was ultimately Naegi and Hajime, carrying their respective burdens of hope and despair, that he thought were really amazing. Kodaka was moved to tears watching the scene of Makoto confronting Kyosuke, especially because of Megumi Ogata and Toshiyuki Morikawa's acting. Higa believes it was thanks to Makoto's role in the anime that Kyosuke became a more appealing character, shown by their interactions. Morikawa regards Kyosuke as a charimastic leader, based on his actions within Future Foundation, but had trouble wondering how much emotion he should give the character during the recording of the series, based on Kishi's suggestions and the rehearsals. Due to Kyosuke's tragic story in the Future Arc, Morikawa said that his character became more corruputed with each story, based on his allies' death, to the point there might be hints of him suffering a mental breakdown; and, as Kodaka originally intended, he was meant to die in the narrative. Morikawa claimed that fans had to pay attention to Kyosuke, Chisa, and Juzo in both anime story arcs, in order to properly understand them.

Because of their lack of experience with anime, the game's staff found it difficult to handle the anime scenario meetings, which involved more people than attended a game meeting. Overseeing the scripts proved difficult for the staff, especially due to having eight-hours-long talks per week. Spike created the designs, as Hope's Peak Academy was drawn for the first time. In the Future Arc, the place was redesigned as ruins. Ogata said she found the anime too dark and gruesome; and even longtime fans would be bothered by the amount of violence in the narrative, such as the heroines dying. In turn, she wished for something more lighthearted, to create a contrast with the dark episodes. After getting their feedback, Ogata said "viewers were in despair". In retrospect, Kodaka was satisfied with the final product, finding it "top-notch". He said he felt obliged to do the anime to appeal to the franchise's fans. However, he claims he will not make another anime like this. As for characters, he aimed to contrast the anime with the games, so the narrative does not focus on culprits. Kodaka apologized to actor Junichi Suwabe, saying he received negative feedback from fans for his character, Juzo Sakakura, except for the elements showing he had a close connection with Kyosuke.

=== Release ===
Japanese Blu-ray box containing the three story arcs of the series

The series was announced at a Danganronpa press conference in December 2015. Divided into two parts, Future Arc, aired between July 11, 2016 and September 26, 2016, and Despair Arc, which aired between July 14, 2016, and September 22, 2016, on Tokyo MX and BS11. The final episode, Hope Arc, aired on September 29, 2016.

Both parts were simulcast in North America, the United Kingdom, and Ireland by Funimation, who began streaming English-dubbed versions starting on August 10, 2016. The English dubbing cast for Danganronpa: Trigger Happy Havoc was replaced with the cast of Funimation's dub for Danganronpa: the Animation, save for Bryce Papenbrook who plays Makoto Naegi in both versions. Meanwhile, most of the cast of Danganronpa 2: Goodbye Despair reprised their roles, including Papenbrook once more as Nagito Komaeda and Johnny Yong Bosch as Hajime Hinata/Izuru Kamakura. Shortly after the dub was completed, Funimation apologized to the viewers for putting an outtake in the finished product and had to redo the cut. While early English-dubbed episodes aired as quickly as possible, Funimation had to delay some for unknown reasons, leading the audience to use the fandub channels. In the original Japanese series, there is a scene in the finale where Nagito talks joyfully while holding hands with Makoto, whom he declares to be his idol for their similar talents; but he is taken by his friends before he can complete their interaction. Papenbrook added a line for Nagito that would come across comically as homoerotic and claimed he had fun making his two characters have such a talk.

Future Arc's opening theme is "Dead or Lie" by Maon Kurosaki and Trustrick, while the ending theme is "Recall the End" by Trustrick. Despair Arc's opening theme is "Kami-iro Awase" (カミイロアワセ; lit."Matching the Color of God") by Binaria, while the ending theme is "Zettai Kibō Birthday" (絶対希望バースデー; lit. "Ultimate Hope Birthday") by Megumi Ogata. Ogata said she felt pressure performing the ending theme, because the stress from working on both arcs left her exhausted. She asked for help from the staff when it came to singing the theme. The ending theme for Hope Side is "Ever Free" by hide with Spread Beaver. An original video animation episode, titled Super Danganronpa 2.5: Komaeda Nagito to Sekai no Hakaisha, was released with special editions of Danganronpa V3: Killing Harmony in Japan on January 12, 2017.

Between September 28, 2016, and February 22, 2017, both story arcs were released on a total of six DVDs and Blu-ray volumes by NBCUniversal Entertainment Japan. Four Blu-ray boxes, containing additional material, were also released. Another Blu-ray box containing the entire series was released on November 25, 2018, as well as one in celebration of the game series' 10th anniversary. The game Kirigiri Sou was released on Microsoft Windows and OS X on November 25, 2016, in Japan and China, and was made available bundled with the third Blu-ray box set of the anime series.

Funimation released the English series in two Blu-ray sets on October 3, 2017, and re-released them as part of their essentials line on August 26, 2019, also in two sets. The first Blu-ray volume of Future Arc sold 3,017 units. In Australia, Madman Entertainment licensed the series and released the series' home media release of the series on December 6, 2017. Animax Asia streamed the series in Southeast Asia.

== Other media ==
A manga spin-off illustrated by Mitomo Sasako, titled Danganronpa Gaiden: Killer Killer, began serialization in Kodansha's Bessatsu Shōnen Magazine from March 9, 2016. Initially released as simply Killer Killer, its third chapter, published on May 9, 2016, revealed the series to be a side-story of Danganronpa 3. The series focuses on Misaki Asano, a young woman assigned to the Future Foundation's sixth branch. She specializes in murder investigations, and is teamed up with fellow investigator Takumi Hijirihara, who, following "The Tragedy", has secretly become a serial killer, known as the "Killer Killer", obsessed with killing other serial killers the pair are tasked with apprehending. Two comic anthologies were released on September 9, 2016, and another was released on October 25, 2016, by Kadokawa Shoten.

A stage play was based on the anime, with InnocentSphere's Hideyuki Nishimori writing the script and directing. It premiered on July 20, 2018. Shun Nishime took the leading role of Makoto Naegi. He claimed that his character was an ideal hero based on his actions presented in the high school scenario. He also admitted being a fan of the Danganronpa games and felt joy when being cast as Makoto. Natsume Okamoto happily played the role of Kyoko Kirigiri. Riho Iida claimed she would give her best effort with Aoi Aasahina. Nishimori said that because of difficulties in casting other actors, they could not adapt the Despair Arc.

Themed food and drinks were sold, in a collaboration between Spike Chunsoft and the Cure Maid Cafe. The Despair Arc collaboration ran from August 26 to September 12, 2016, and the Future Arc collaboration ran from September 13 to October 2, 2016.

A Danganronpa 3 collaboration is also present in Hōkai Gakuen 2, a Chinese side-scrolling shooter mobile game developed by miHoYo for iOS and Android.

In promoting the anime, a collaboration between Danganronpa and Absolute took place in Tokyo during 2016, where fans could interact with the voice actors, with Takayama reprising her role of Hajime.

== Reception ==
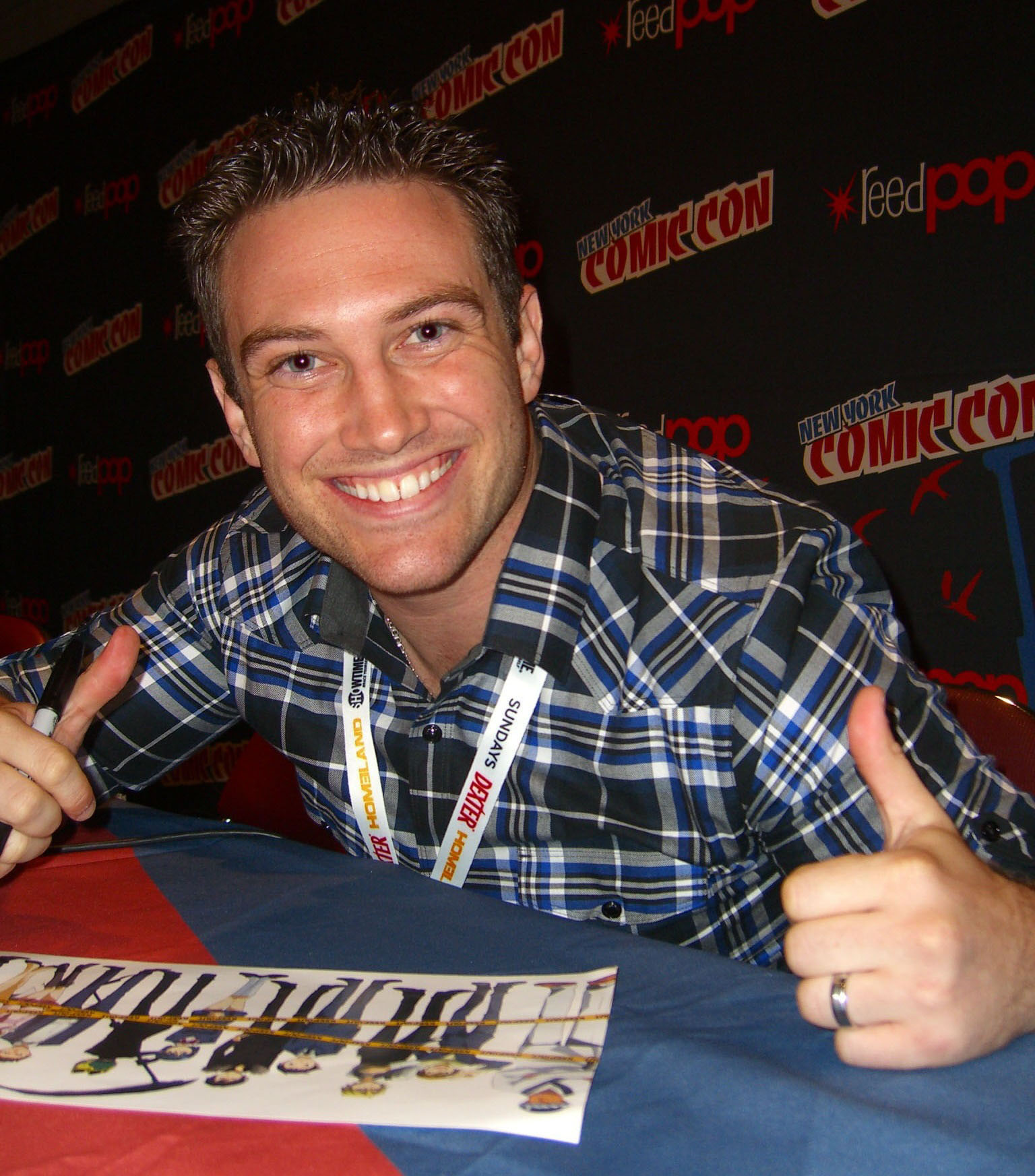
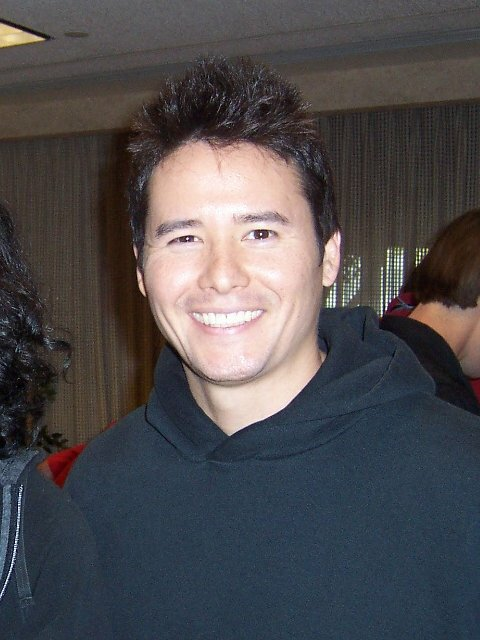
Bryce Papenbrook (left) and Johnny Yong Bosch (right) were praised for their performances as Makoto Naegi and Hajime Hinata respectively.

The series was received positively by fans. Pollsters Charapedia ranked it as the ninth most anticipated anime of 2016. According to Polygon, Western fans voted it as the tenth best new anime series from 2016. Polygon noted that the character of Junko Enoshima became more popular thanks to the anime, especially her interaction with Ryota Mitarai about the importance of anime to Japanese culture. Although the English dub changed lines from the original series, the site said it still appealed to the audience. HobbyConsolas listed it as one of the best anime series released in 2016. In a Manga.Tokyo poll in 2016, Future Arc was the 21st most popular anime of the season, while Despair Arc was 33rd. In a Goo Ranking poll, the entire series was voted the 19th best anime of Summer 2016. In a Biggest in Japan poll, Future Arc was voted the sixth best anime of Summer 2016 while Despair Arc was eighth.

In reviewing the anime's three story arcs, GamesRadar's Kenneth Shepard praised the series, saying that despite the franchise changing media from games to television, the series' narrative was appropriate. He felt the story was easy to understand by newcomers, not just by returning players. USGamer regarded End of Hope's Peak Academy as a better Danganronpa anime than its predecessor. It was recommended the series to people who have played the first two games as it continues their narratives. HardCore Gaming recommended watching the two arcs together since both make reference to each other. The website praised Seiji Kishi's direction of both series, despite finding some of the arcs' elements frustrating. THEM Anime Reviews's Tim Jones gave it two stars out of five, panning the series because of the amount of exposition in the series and because it requires knowledge of both arcs to understand the plot. He criticized the short screen-time given the antagonist and felt that the series would require more episodes to recreate a more coherent work. Other issues involved the dark tone, such as Makoto's attempted suicide when learning the modus operandi from the culprit or the decision to revive a character in Hope. Like Jones, Chris Beveridge of The Fandom Post felt that Future Arc can only be fully enjoyed alongside the Despair Arc because of their interconnectedness.

Some critics found the first episodes of Future Arc appealing but were bothered by the new characters who harshly antagonize Makoto. As noted by Beveridge and UK Anime Network's Dan Barnett, this in turn made the narrative too dark, the darkness emphasized by the drab atmospheric color palette, which resulted in mixed reactions. UK Anime Network scored it a 7 out of 10. Critics found the antagonism between allies, such as Juzo and Kyosuke and Izayoi and Ruruka confusing, particularly in how they wind up killing each other. They praised Makoto's rivalry with Kyosuke, the similarities in their ideals of hope—a theme commonly explored in the franchise—and how Makoto managed to stay true to himself in the end, to redeem his corrupted rival in an argument.

Critics felt that Makoto's love for Kyoko made his character grow more powerful, and his second confrontation with Kyosuke more impactful, especially because of the parallels between the two characters. James Becket of Anime News Network found the story unique but he, too, felt that, to enjoy it fully, the viewer needs to watch both interconnected arcs. He gave a "B" to Funimation's release, while panning the art and animation provided by Lerche. He praised the English cast—including Caitlin Glass, who played Kyoko—but felt that the entire cast had been overshadowed by the lead actor, Bryce Papenbrook, who provided "the goofy charm and charisma that has made Makoto such an endearing hero over the years".

Barnett felt the early episodes of Despair Arc were too comical and slow-paced. Nevertheless, he found it passable and worth watching despite its flaws. Hajime's interactions with Chiaki were praised. Many felt their relationship became tragic when Hajime nearly lost his humanity, to the point where he could not react to her death. Beckett was more positive. He found the new cast appealing, including the return of Junko Enoshima as an antagonist. Thanasis Karavasilis, of Manga Tokyo, was glad that Junko had returned, but felt the other characters were not as entertaining.

Beveridge found that most of the cast was not as engaging as the characters in Danganronpa: The Animation, because of the more serious tone of this series. He acknowledged he did not know Hajime or the rest of the cast members from Goodbye Despair because he had not played the original visual novel. He felt the number of deaths was too depressing, as he could not become attached to any of the more outstanding members of the cast. Nevertheless, he felt Funimation's release was well done, as was the English dub they provided. Manga.Tokyo's reviewer named Nagito as one of his favorite characters, believing his calm demeanor and distinctive design made an interesting parallel to Junko. The encounter between Nagito and Hajime's alter ego, Izuru, earned mixed responses; though it was appealing, it could only be fanservice to returning fans. Beckett found the English cast entertaining, mentioning actors such as Johnny Yong Bosch, who played Hajime, and Colleen Clinkenbeard, as Chisa. In conclusion, Beckett enjoyed the storyline, but felt the animation was inferior, and gave the compilation a "B+".

Hope Arc earned an average "B−" rating from Anime News Network's Jacob Chapman, who found the relationship between Makoto and Kyoko Kirigiri one of the most appealing and compared them to Romeo and Juliet as a romantic tragedy. But he felt a fake plot twist ruined the portrayal of the burden Makoto had been carrying. Nevertheless, he found it appealing, but not as deeply moving as it could have been. Because of the handling of the antagonist, he did not feel Makato was as likable as other characters introduced throughout Future Arc. He found the encounters of both protagonists interesting, despite claiming there were no major tragedies on Makoto's side because of Kyoko's survival. Thanasis Karavasilis felt that Hope Arc was more interesting than Chapman did. He believed the anime gave Makoto and Hajime a strong finale, especially with the revelation of Kyoko's survival, whom he deemed as too important for the former. He praised the encounter between Makoto and the villain Mitarai, as during their encounter neither was made out as the culprit. In addition, Karavasilis praised the execution of the finale based on the originality of the encounter and how original the result was, when comparing it to the trials from the video games, scoring it a 6 out of 6. GamesRadar also felt the anime similarly brought closure to Makoto's story arc.
