= Danganronpa: Trigger Happy Havoc =

2010 visual novel

- Cover art featuring Monokuma and Hope's Peak Academy
- Developer: Spike (Note: Currently known as Spike Chunsoft; additional work for Windows, OS X, and Linux by Abstraction Games.)
- Publisher: Spike (Note: Currently known as Spike Chunsoft; PlayStation 4 and PlayStation Vita versions originally published by NIS America outside of Japan.)
- Producer: Yoshinori Terasawa
- Artist: Rui Komatsuzaki
- Writer: Kazutaka Kodaka
- Composer: Masafumi Takada
- Series: Danganronpa
- Engine: Unity (Anniversary)
- Platforms: PlayStation Portable; iOS; Android; PlayStation Vita; Linux; OS X; Microsoft Windows; PlayStation 4
- Release: November 25, 2010: PlayStation Portable; JP: November 25, 2010 iOS; JP: August 20, 2012 Anniversary Edition; WW: May 21, 2020 Android; JP: August 27, 2012 Anniversary Edition; May 21, 2020 PlayStation Vita; JP: October 10, 2013; NA: February 11, 2014; PAL: February 14, 2014 Linux, OS X; WW: February 18, 2016 Microsoft Windows; WW: February 18, 2016 Anniversary Edition; WW: January 18, 2022 PlayStation 4; Reload; NA: March 14, 2017; EU: March 17, 2017; JP: May 18, 2017
- Genres: Adventure, visual novel
- Mode: Single-player

Danganronpa: Trigger Happy Havoc (Note: Japanese: ダンガンロンパ 希望の学園と絶望の高校生, Hepburn: Danganronpa: Kibō no Gakuen to Zetsubō no Kōkōsei) is a visual novel adventure game developed and published by Spike. The first installment in the Danganronpa series, it was originally released for the PlayStation Portable in Japan in November 2010. NIS America localized and published the game internationally on PlayStation consoles, with the first release of the game in English occurring in 2014.

The player controls a high school student named Makoto Naegi who finds himself involved in a battle royale in Hope's Peak Academy, where the robot bear Monokuma gives the students the chance to escape from the establishment if they murder another student and are not voted as the killer in a trial. The game sees Makoto interact with other students to solve "class trials" by shooting at arguments displayed on the screen.

The game originated from writer Kazutaka Kodaka's idea to generate a new type of game, as he believed the original adventure games were no longer popular. As a result, he created a dark scenario that generated controversy within Spike due to the amount of violence displayed among students. Nevertheless, the company decided to develop it alongside the unique gameplay system which they thought was less derivative from other games. The cast was designed by Rui Komatsuzaki.

Danganronpa was a commercial success and earned positive reviews for the handling of the cast and story. It won awards, though critics were divided on the lack of challenging difficulty in solving class trials and its minigames. A sequel, Danganronpa 2: Goodbye Despair, was released in 2012. A compilation of both games, titled Danganronpa 1・2 Reload, was released for PlayStation Vita in Japan in October 2013, and worldwide in March 2017. The game produced several adaptions and spin-offs: an anime television series, a stage show, two manga, and two novels.

== Gameplay ==
An example of gameplay in Danganronpa. The player is in a Class Trial finding an issue with a character's comment and shooting a "bullet" towards such a sentence.

Danganronpa: Trigger Happy Havoc is a murder mystery game that casts players in the role of Makoto Naegi, a student of Hope's Peak Academy who finds himself trapped in a game of mutual killing among his peers. The gameplay is stylistically similar to Capcom's Ace Attorney series by being centered around investigation and finding contradictions, albeit with an emphasis on faster gameplay. Each chapter of the game features two styles of gameplay: School Life, in which the player explores the academy and progresses through the story, and the Class Trial, where the player must determine the culprit of a crime.

During School Life, the player can explore the school grounds in first-person perspective, with more areas of the academy becoming available as the game progresses. Whilst in one of the various rooms, players move a crosshair cursor which is used to initiate conversations with characters or examine parts of the environment. Examining certain objects yields Monokuma Coins, which can be used at a capsule machine in the school shop to unlock presents. School Life is divided into two sections: "Daily Life" and "Deadly Life". In the Daily Life sections, players converse with various characters and move the plot along based on dating sim elements. New information can be revealed by "reacting to" certain comments. In designated "Free Time" segments, players can choose to hang out with specific characters and give them presents, which in turn reveals more information about them and unlocks various Skills that can be used in the Class Trials. When a crime scene is discovered, the game shifts to the Deadly Life section, where the player must search for clues throughout the academy. Evidence and testimonies gathered are stored in the player's e-Handbook, where players can also save their game. When all possible evidence is located, the game moves on to the Class Trial. Prior to a Class Trial, players can purchase skills, which can assist them during gameplay.

The Class Trials occur following the discovery of a dead body. Within them, the students discuss amongst themselves who the culprit is. With the exception of occasions where the player must answer a multiple-choice question or present a piece of evidence, Class Trials consist of four main modes of gameplay: Nonstop Debate, Hangman's Gambit, Bullet Time Battle, and Closing Argument. In the Nonstop Debate, characters discuss their thoughts on the case, with potential "weak points" highlighted in yellow. During these sections, the player is armed with "Truth Bullets" based on third-person shooter gaming: metaphorical bullets containing evidence relevant to the discussion. In order to "break" the debate, stopping it from going on indefinitely, the player must find a lie or contradiction amongst the weak points and shoot it with a bullet containing the evidence that contradicts it. Players can also silence disruptive purple chatter to earn extra time and utilize a Concentration meter to slow down the conversation and make shots more easily. Trials occasionally require the player to absorb a classmate's remark and use it as ammunition against another. Hangman's Gambit is a shooting puzzle section in which the player must shoot down specific letters that spell out a clue. Bullet Time Battle is a one-on-one debate against another student featuring rhythm-style gameplay. As the opponent makes remarks, the player must press buttons in time to the beat to lock onto the remarks and shoot them down. Finally, Closing Argument is a puzzle in which players piece together a comic strip depicting how a crime occurred. The player's Influence amongst the other students is represented by hearts, which is reduced whenever the player makes errors in shooting contradictions or presenting evidence, and is replenished when correct evidence is presented. The game ends if the player loses all of their Influence, or if they run out of time during a segment. At the end of a trial, players are ranked on their performance, with additional Monokuma Medals awarded for high ranks.

From the PlayStation Vita version onward, the game features an additional School Life mode, based on the Island Mode introduced in Danganronpa 2, which is unlocked after clearing the game once. In this alternative mode, Monokuma tasks the students with building several backup units of himself over several days. Each day, the player assigns students to scavenge rooms for necessary materials needed to build each concept, keep the school clean, or rest up to recover energy. During Free Time, players can either hang out with the other students to unlock skills just like in the main game, or use Trip Tickets earned from completed concepts to take them on trips.

== Plot ==
Danganronpa takes place at an elite high school named Hope's Peak Academy (希望ヶ峰学園, Kibōgamine Gakuen), which accepts talented "Ultimate" students (超高校級, chō-kōkō-kyū; lit. Super High School Level) of the highest caliber in various fields each year. Makoto Naegi, a fairly optimistic but otherwise average student, is selected in a raffle and chosen to enroll into the academy as the Ultimate Lucky Student. He meets fourteen other newly picked Ultimate students. A sadistic, remote-controlled bear named Monokuma appears before them, telling them they will be imprisoned in the academy for the rest of their lives, and that they will be put to death if they violate any of the school's rules. He states that there is only one way that a student can leave the academy: murder another student and avoid being identified as the culprit. If they are found out, the murderer will be violently executed; if the class identifies the wrong student as the murderer, they will all be killed and the real murderer will be allowed to "graduate".

After a murder occurs and the remaining students are given some time to investigate it, a "class trial" (学級裁判, gakyū saiban) is held, in which the remaining students must determine amongst themselves who the killer is. Makoto frequently takes the role of arbiter of the trial, providing most of the logical insights. Makoto receives assistance from Kyoko Kirigiri, a distant girl who possesses keen observational and deductive skills, but whose Ultimate talent is unknown. Several murders occur over the course of the game, with the respective culprits being caught and executed. Pop star Sayaka Maizono, a childhood friend of Makoto's, is murdered by baseball star Leon Kuwata after her plans to murder Leon and frame Makoto for it fail. Gyaru fashionista Junko Enoshima is executed by Monokuma after she attacks him. Programmer Chihiro Fujisaki is murdered by gang leader Mondo Owada in a jealous rage over the former's perceived strength, after which it is revealed that heir Byakuya Togami tampered with the crime scene to frame novelist Toko Fukawa and reveal the infamous serial killer Genocide Jack to be her split personality. Gambler Celestia Ludenberg manipulates doujinshi creator Hifumi Yamada into killing honor student Kiyotaka Ishimaru, before killing Hifumi herself. Martial artist Sakura Ogami is found dead after being revealed to be a spy blackmailed into working for Monokuma, before her "murder" is discovered to have actually been a suicide in order to avoid further betraying her friends. The person controlling Monokuma commits the final murder of an initially unknown victim, who is discovered to be the previously unseen mercenary Mukuro Ikusaba. As a result of the mastermind planting evidence, the only apparent culprits from the surviving students are Makoto and Kyoko. A bad ending occurs if Makoto presents evidence that implicates Kyoko as the killer; she is executed while Makoto and the remaining students live trapped in the academy forever. In the true ending, Makoto is convicted but is saved by Alter Ego, an artificial intelligence program left behind by Chihiro. Makoto and the remaining students work together to solve the final murder and discover that the true mastermind behind the killing game is the real Junko Enoshima. She employed Mukuro, her fraternal twin sister, to impersonate her, only to kill her on a whim out of her love for despair. She later used Mukuro's corpse as a "murder victim" to falsely implicate Kyoko, as the latter's talent as the Ultimate Detective proved to be a threat to Junko's plans.

Junko reveals that all of the students had already been in the academy for two years and were previously classmates. However, when an academic societal uprising began, the headmaster of Hope's Peak Academy, viewing the high amount of talent in the students as a sign of hope, decided (with the students' permission) to barricade him and themselves inside the academy to wait out the crisis. Junko executed the headmaster, took control of the academy, and erased all of the students' memories of the events that took place after they arrived at the academy two years ago. With Makoto's help, the students all overcome the doubt brought about by Junko's bombshells and decide to leave the academy. Realizing her secret has been exposed, Junko executes herself because she enjoys the feeling of despair that comes with her losing the final trial. The six surviving students (Makoto; Kyoko; Byakuya; Toko/Genocide Jack; swimmer Aoi Asahina; and clairvoyant Yasuhiro Hagakure) exit the academy, uncertain of the current state of the world. In a post-credits scene, Monokuma re-activates.

== Development ==
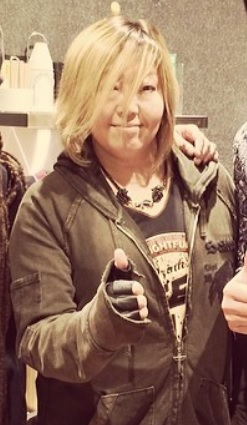
Megumi Ogata (pictured) voices the lead character Makoto Naegi in Japanese. Her performance convinced writer Kazutaka Kodaka to make Makoto gradually stronger than intended.

Danganronpa originated from writer Kazutaka Kodaka's desire to create an original video game. He felt his previous ideas were derivative of the action-adventure genre. He felt they were not popular among gamers, so he instead conceptualized a darker narrative focused on the idea of a "killing game". As the staff found the premise interesting, they decided to change the style in order to create a project that would sell more than the original concept. Spike did not like the game, with the developers considering outsourcing it as they wanted Danganronpa to be their own original product. Spike Chunsoft thought Danganronpa was a risky game due to Kodaka's ideas involving high school students killing each other despite the company having produced similar games before. Since the first execution scene is linked to bullying and is rather grotesque, they were also worried about the reaction of gamers' parents. However, there was a shock value that the team was excited for. The gameplay was titled "Stylish High Speed Reasoning Action" while the cast was designed under the idea of "psycho pop", and influenced by X Japan's former guitarist Hide by coloring the blood pink as both a form of censorship and stylishness. The word Danganronpa originated from character designer Rui Komatsuzaki, and was written in kanji before being changed to katakana in the logo. Kodaka had originally proposed a darker narrative under the game's working title Distrust, but Spike rejected it due to its dark nature. Producer Yoshinori Terasawa cites Saw (2004) and Cube (1997) as movies that inspired the team.

The game uses a special graphics technique, termed "2.5D Motion Graphics", used to blend 2D character and item art within a 3D explorable environment. The game uses pop art and a bright and colorful style, which utilizes bright pink-colored blood to contrast the dark subject matter of murder. The game's scenario was written by Kodaka, with character designs by Rui Komatsuzaki. Kodaka stated he wanted to "...shake user's heart [sic] by showing a devastating accident in not devastating ways. But, by some measure, it might be more shocking than showing a devastating scene."

Kodaka wanted to surprise gamers with the death of Sayaka Maizono, who was promoted as the game's heroine. After her death, it is revealed that she wanted to frame Makoto for a murder she would commit; it was written to generate a major impact in both the character and the player, which would have resulted in Makoto suffering bad feelings for how he would be treated. Due to budget constraints, some lines were not voice acted, which made Makoto's actress Megumi Ogata want to speak some important lines in retrospect. She felt similarly with the anime adaptation, as she thought it was too trimmed. Kodaka claimed some lines did not fit Makoto, such as when the player is exploring an area; he thought Spike could have added more appropriate lines if they had a larger budget. Terasawa aimed to balance the cast's qualities by having the player act as Makoto, as he does not share the unique attributes the other students have. Although Makoto and Kyoko interact in the game multiple times, Kodaka claimed he never wrote the latter to be the former's love interest; instead, the interactions between Makoto and his supporting characters were created due to Kirigiri's skills as a detective which would help the player in solving cases. Initially, Makoto was written as an unreliable teenager but Kodaka changed his mind upon seeing the performance of Ogata. Kodaka was surprised by Ogata's work so he decided to make Makoto stronger, most notably in the game's finale.

According to Kodaka, the first two games focus prominently on the theme of hope and despair. The characters from the first game suffer despair when they are forced to kill each other in Monokuma's battle royale. Kodaka said that he wanted the players to experience the contrast between the despair of murders and the hope from solving cases. Although the game shares traits with Koushun Takami's 1999 novel Battle Royale, Kodaka tried to provide different ideas when writing the script. The idea was originally conceptualized with adult protagonists, but he found high school characters to be better due to their immaturity, easier character development, and how they would react to a killing game. Ogata said Danganronpa often touches on both elements of despair and hope. The characters experience despair while they are trapped in the school and Makoto provides more emotional support to the cast across the story, giving the actress a far more optimistic message that the students are going to survive.

For the English dub of the game, Spike Chunsoft specifically requested NIS America to keep Monokuma's name intact. The team described the character as their favorite to localize, working together to keep the character looking funny and at the same time threatening like in the Japanese version, which led to difficulties in finding a suitable voice actor to embody their "hyperactive psychopath[ic] nature" due to the "beloved[ness]" of the original voice actress, characterizing him as "bossy, condescending, smarmy, goofy, quick to anger, quick to forgive, quick to anger again, devious, and totally lovable". The game's original soundtrack, composed by Masafumi Takada, was released by Sound Prestige Records on February 14, 2011.

== Release ==
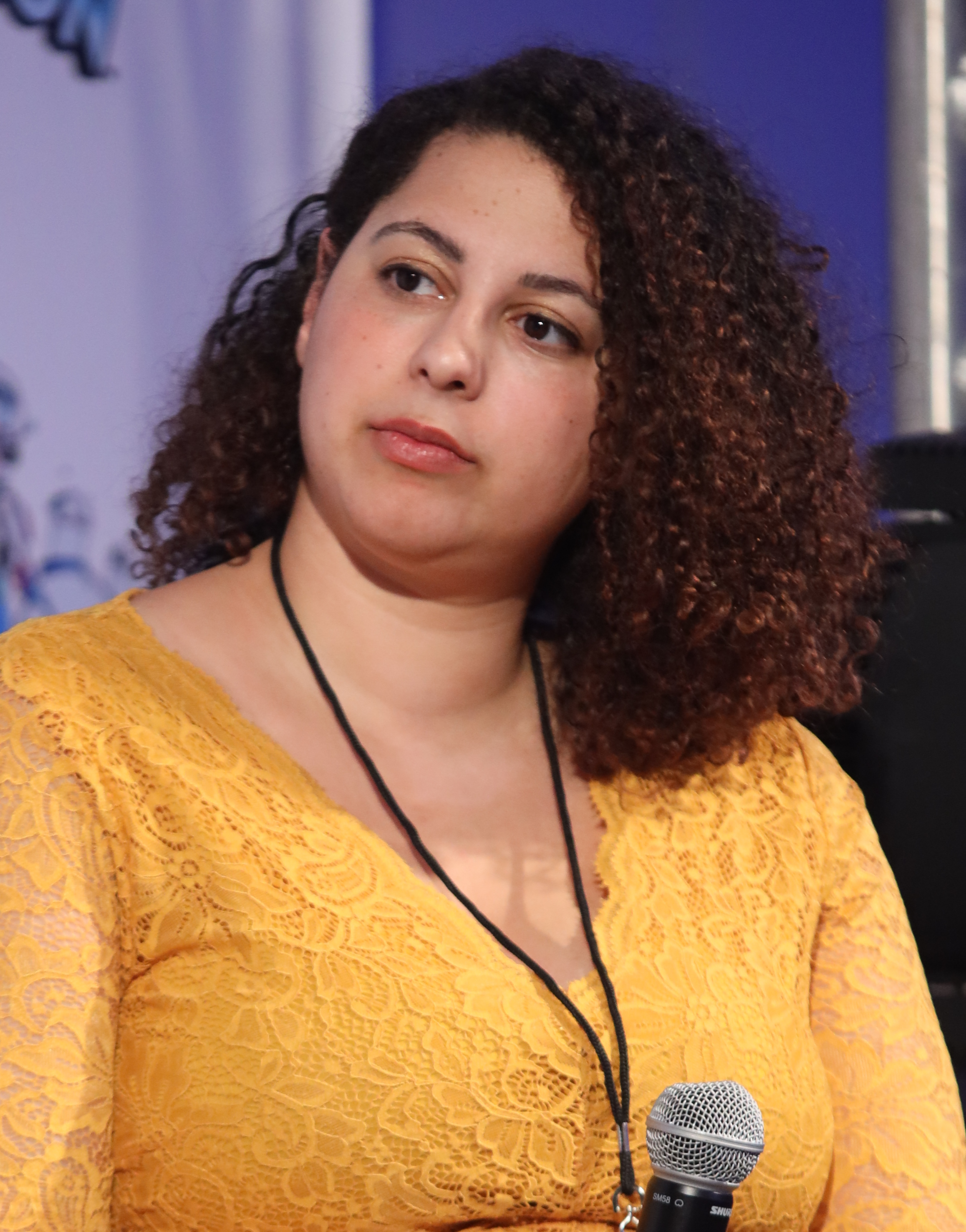
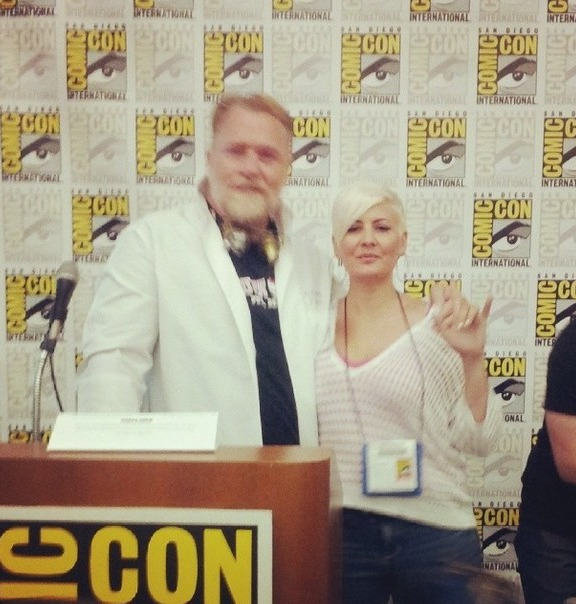
Toko's dual personality proved to be difficult to find an appropriate English actress: Amanda C. Miller (left) and Erin Fitzgerald (right) voiced them.

Prior to release, a free demo version containing the first chapter of the game (with a different victim from the final game) was made available. A bonus Monokuma key chain was given to people who pre-ordered the original PlayStation Portable (PSP) version, Danganronpa: Trigger Happy Havoc was released for the PSP in Japan on November 25, 2010. A port of the game was released to iOS on August 21, 2012, with new features such as retina display support, touch screen controls, and a new image gallery. A port for Android-based phones followed on August 27, 2012.

The game could be purchased as individual chapters, or as a whole like the PlayStation Portable release.

Spike wanted Danganronpa to remain true to its Japanese release, with Spike Chunsoft CEO Mitsutoshi Sakurai saying that Western fans seemed to embrace Japanese games like the Final Fantasy series. Due to delays with an English localization being made, fan translations of the first game became available online before NIS America handled the project. Minor changes were made to the characters' names but the team thought that the project was as faithful and accessible to the Western gamers. Spike's single request to NIS America was keeping Monokuma's name intact. While the English cast did not cause difficulties, Toko Fukawa's English voice actress was the most challenging to find as the character has an alter-ego with a psychopathic personality, Genocide Jack. Monokuma was kept intact in order to make him look funny and at the same time threatening, something the team enjoyed.

Two smartphone games, Danganronpa: Monokuma no Gyakushū (ダンガンロンパ モノクマの逆襲; lit. Danganronpa: Monokuma Strikes Back) and Alter Ego (アルターエゴ, Arutāego), were released for Android devices on April 27, 2012, and iOS devices on May 23, 2012. Following the Japanese release of Danganronpa 1-2 Reload, a PlayStation Vita port of the game and its sequel, Danganronpa 2: Goodbye Despair, NIS America released the Vita version of Trigger Happy Havoc in North America on February 11, 2014. This was followed by releases in Australia, New Zealand and PAL territories on February 14, 2014. Spike Chunsoft later released the game on Steam on February 18, 2016. A compilation of both Trigger Happy Havoc and its sequel Danganronpa 2: Goodbye Despair (2012) titled Danganronpa 1-2 Reload was released in Japan for the Vita on October 10, 2013. NIS America released Danganronpa 1-2 Reload for PlayStation 4 in North America and Europe in March 2017, and Japan on May 18, 2017. A virtual reality demo based on the game, titled Cyber Danganronpa VR: The Class Trial, was released for PlayStation VR on October 13, 2016.

An enhanced version for Android and iOS, with the subtitle Anniversary Edition, was released on May 21, 2020. This version features the gallery mode, and redone controls, map and navigation systems. During E3 2021, it was announced that it will be released for the Nintendo Switch in 2021, both as part of the Danganronpa Decadence bundle, as well as separately. On January 18, 2022, it was released for Xbox One and Windows via Microsoft Store.

== Reception ==
=== Sales ===
During its first week on sale in Japan, Danganronpa: Trigger Happy Havoc sold a total of 25,564 copies and was the eighth best-selling game of the week. After three months of sales, the game had sold over 85,000 copies, a number Sakurai labelled a success. In Japan, the game has sold a total of 258,250 copies on the PSP and is the best-selling Danganronpa game. Danganronpa 1・2 Reload for the PlayStation Vita sold a total of 76,172 copies during its first week on sale in Japan and was the fifth best-selling game of the week. The PS4 version sold a total of 3,880 copies during its first week on sale in Japan and was the eighth best-selling game of the week. Danganronpa 1・2 Reload has sold a total of 187,202 copies in Japan (PS Vita: 177,149 copies/PS4: 10,053 copies).

In the West, Danganronpa: Trigger Happy Havoc and Danganronpa 2 sold over 200,000 copies combined in the United States and Europe by April 29, 2015, which NIS America CEO Takuro Yamashita said was impressive since they were PS Vita exclusives. The Steam release of the game had an estimated total of 234,000 players by July 2018. By October 2021, Spike Chunsoft confirmed that the game had achieved over 1 million sales on PC alone.

=== Reviews ===
Reception

Aggregate score
Aggregator	Score
Metacritic	VITA: 80/100; PC: 82/100

Review scores
Publication	Score
Destructoid	8.5/10
Electronic Gaming Monthly	9/10
Eurogamer	4.5/5 (US)
Famitsu	9/10, 10/10, 8/10, 9/10
Game Informer	8.5/10
GameSpot	8/10
GamesRadar+	4/5
Giant Bomb	3/5
IGN	8.5/10
MeriStation	8.5/10
Play	85%
Polygon	8/10
RPGFan	90%
TouchArcade	4.5/5
Gaming Age	A−
Vandal	8.4/10

Awards
Publication	Award
GameFan	Game of the Year, Best Sony Portable Exclusive Game, Best Adventure Game
Game Informer	Best Vita Exclusive, Best Adventure
RPGFan	Best Story, Best Graphic Adventure

Upon release, Danganronpa: Trigger Happy Havoc received "generally favorable" reviews from video game publications based on the review aggregate website Metacritic aimed towards the PC and Vita ports. In a Japanese poll, Spike asked fans what appealed Japanese players in regards to the game. Most players' answers involved how innovative Trigger Happy Havoc was.

Much of the focus within reviews involved positive feedback in regards to the narrative. GamesRadar writer Brittany Vincent gave praise to the narrative, calling it "devilishly addictive". Colin Moriarty from IGN similarly praised its writing and soundtrack, calling it "a must-own game for hardcore Vita owners". Hale Bradly from Hardcore Gamer praised the game's characters, stating that "the cast of personalities and their truly diverse characteristics are what make the game such gold", although he criticized the game's obvious twists. Matthew Pollesel from Gaming Age gave Danganronpa an almost perfect score and called it "incredibly complex", despite finding it borrowing from other games like the Corpse Party series or Zero Escape: Virtue's Last Reward, and warned players of its dark narrative based on the gore shown through each murder scene. Laura Kate from MyM claimed it stands out from most visual novel games in how well it weaves other genres into its narrative.

Multiple writers commented on the gameplay mechanics, praising the character interactions and Class Trials. Play considered the Class Trials to be one of the most unique aspects from the game, as it demands more actions than other visual novel games. Similar to Ace Attorney, in Danganronpa the player must interact with a specific comment mentioned by a character by shooting a "bullet" at it, giving it a stylish feel. GamesRadar also enjoyed the Class Trials for the multiple fast-paced elements provided by the developers, IGN felt that the Class Trials are not only interesting for the gameplay mechanics but also because of the multiple interactions within the characters who suspect of each other. Nevertheless, IGN criticized the linear nature of the trials. A critic from Electronic Gaming Monthly, Mollie L. Patterson Mollie, claimed the execution of all these elements surprised the publication for how unique it turned out to be. Hardcore Gamer also noticed the number of items provided during investigations and interactions which are needed to solve the cases and find the culprits.

Multiple writers focused on the art style and character designs, which they felt helped to easily tell apart characters and enjoy their interactions with Makoto. Ramón Varela from the Vandal, on the other hand, felt that the designs made the main characters come across as stereotypes. Besides the serious class trials he solves, Makoto received attention from PlayStation LifeStyle's Russell Ritchey and Polygon's Megan Farokhmanesh for his interactions with the main cast that developed the relationships between them. However, Vincent felt the dating sim elements were lacking. One reviewer in Famitsu found that the story's themes and characters were a bit commonplace, but the game had a unique and intriguing momentum that overcame these elements.

Negative response often focused on the low difficulty. Bradly Halestrom criticized how in certain cases, learning the murderer's identity as a player was too easy, taking less time than the characters in the game required. Both Giant Bomb's Patrick Klepek and RPGFan's John McCarroll agreed, who found the difficulty to be lacking during the trials, while also stating that the mini-games did not fit in with the main sections of the game. Ramón Varela from Vandal felt that the investigations for trials had to be taken seriously, since Makoto has to find logical errors in a specific argument rather than just shooting a bullet at random. On the other hand, Moriarty found the class trials to be complex and noted that they would generally entertain players. Besides focusing on the number of mini-games the trials offer, Vincent found the English audio appealing enough in comparison the original Japanese version. The discovery of the "true" gender of a character received mixed reception from Klepek, who called the discovery "a cheap plot device that's not handled with very much sensitivity".

=== Awards ===
GameFan awarded the game as "Game of the Year", "Best Sony Portable Exclusive Game", and "Best Adventure Game". Game Informer deemed it "Best Vita Exclusive", while RPGFan awarded it "Best Story" and "Best Graphic Adventure". In 2017, Famitsu readers voted Danganronpa as the fourth best adventure game of all time, behind Steins;Gate, 428: Shibuya Scramble, and Phoenix Wright: Ace Attorney. Dontnod Entertainment creative director Jean-Maxime Moris also chose Danganronpa as his personal game of the year, praising its writing and gameplay mechanics. He also cited it as an influence on Dontnod's own adventure game, Life Is Strange. GameSpot also listed it as one of the best games for the Xbox Series X.

== Legacy ==
Among multiple sequels, Danganronpa has been adapted into manga.

There were no plans for a sequel after the first Danganronpa game was produced; the development team disbanded to make other projects. Kodaka wrote the light novel series Danganronpa Zero, which was published as two volumes on September 15, 2011, and October 13, 2011. Another novel series written by Takekuni Kitayama and illustrated by Komatsuzaki, titled Danganronpa Kirigiri (ダンガンロンパ霧切), began release from September 13, 2013. Around this time, Terasawa approached Kodaka with the idea of writing a sequel to Danganronpa. Kodaka wrote both Zero and Goodbye Despair at the same time. In hindsight, Kodaka thought the novels needed more structuring work when he compared it with the game. He wrote elements in the light novel that foreshadowed elements of the game's sequel, Danganronpa 2: Goodbye Despair; as a result, Kodaka recommended gamers to read Zero before playing it. The third main game in the series, Danganronpa V3: Killing Harmony, was released in 2017.

Danganronpa has received two manga adaptations. The first adaptation, illustrated by Saku Toutani, was published in Enterbrain's Famitsu Comic Clear web magazine between June 24, 2011, and October 18, 2013, and is told from the perspective of the other students. The second, illustrated by Samurai Takashi and based on Danganronpa: The Animation, began serialization in Kadokawa Shoten's Shōnen Ace magazine from July 2013. An official fanbook and comic anthologies based on both the game and the anime have also been published.

A mini light novel written by Ryohgo Narita, titled Danganronpa IF: The Button of Hope and the Tragic Warriors of Despair (ダンガンロンパIF 希望の脱出装置と絶望の残念無双, Danganronpa IF: Kibō no Dasshutsusōchi to Zetsubō no Zan'nen Musō), is unlockable in Danganronpa 2: Goodbye Despair after clearing the game once. The story takes place in an alternate universe where Makoto manages to find an alleged escape switch. Danganronpa: The Animation's original soundtrack was released by Geneon Universal Entertainment on August 28, 2013. An official stage production named Danganronpa The Stage (ダンガンロンパ THE STAGE～希望の学園と絶望の高校生～) ran from October to November 2014 in Tokyo's Nippon Seinenkan, and was presented by Cornflakes. Its cast includes Kanata Hongō, Rei Okamoto, AKB48's Haruka Ishida, and NMB48's Reina Fujie.
