= Chiaki Nanami =

- Danganronpa character
- Art of Chiaki Nanami by Rui Komatsuzaki
- First appearance: Danganronpa 2: Goodbye Despair (2012)
- Created by: Kazutaka Kodaka
- Designed by: Rui Komatsuzaki
- Voiced by: EN: Christine Marie Cabanos; JA: Kana Hanazawa

Chiaki Nanami (Japanese: 七海 千秋, Hepburn: Nanami Chiaki) is a fictional character from Spike's 2012 visual novel Danganronpa 2: Goodbye Despair. Formally known as the Ultimate Gamer (超高校級の「ゲーマー」, Chō-kōkō-kyū no "Gēmā"; lit. Super High School Level Gamer), Chiaki initially appears as an apparent high school student trapped with fifteen other students in the Jabberwock Island chain, where an omnipresent robotic bear named Monokuma forces the student to participate in a killing game in exchange for freedom. She can bond with the protagonist Hajime Hinata in both social life gameplay and the main storyline before her true persona is revealed as the artificial intelligence observer daughter of Chihiro Fujisaki, and the younger sister of Alter Ego and Usami / Monomi. Chiaki makes a cameo appearance in two episodes of the anime series Danganronpa 3: The End of Hope's Peak High School, with an identical character the original Chiaki Nanami, the visual basis for her design, appearing in the prequel Despair Arc who bonds with Hajime.

Chiaki was created by writer Kazutaka Kodaka as the game's heroine, with her traits being based on those of "the ideal woman." She is voiced by Kana Hanazawa in Japanese and Christine Marie Cabanos in English. Critical response to Chiaki has been highly positive due to her major role in the Goodbye Despair narrative as she takes an impact in the class trials and her comfort provided to the main character, to the point of being cited as one of the best characters. The parallels between Chiaki and her human counterpart in the anime series also earned a mixed to positive response.

== Concept and creation ==
In contrast to Kyoko Kirigiri from the first Danganronpa video game whose main goal was assisting the player character Makoto Naegi in investigating the killing cases, Kazutaka Kodaka created Chiaki to be more of a heroine who would bond with Hajime Hinata. describing her as "the ideal type of woman." Rui Komatsuzaki designed the character; in early development of the game, Chiaki was envisioned to be its tallest character.

In regards to characterizing the artificial intelligence Chiaki in the anime series, a second, human Chiaki was envisioned as having once had a fateful meeting with anger-driven Hajime in order to bring across him aid in the story across his multiple dilemmas, including his incoming transformation into his alter-ego Izuru Kamukura, and his developing relationship with future series' antagonist Junko Enoshima, with the artificial intelligence Chiaki basing her physical appearance and actions off of class 77-b's memories of the human Ultimate Gamer. Shortly after the death of the Ultimate Gamer in the anime series, the artificial intelligence Chiaki makes an appearance reenacting the first scenes of Goodbye Despair. Kodaka was initially concerned that people who did not play Goodbye Despair and solely watched the anime series would not understand the distinction between the artificial intelligence Chiaki and her human counterpart as the anime did not explicitly elaborate as such in the scene; consequently as a result, the final episode of the anime series elaborates heavily in dialogue that there were two separate, unrelated characters using the same identity and interacting with Izuru/Hajime.

In Japanese, Chiaki is voiced by Kana Hanazawa whom producer Yoshinori Terasawa felt was a good fit. Hanazawa described Chiaki as "someone who may not stand out among her classmates who ooze uniqueness, but once she begins talking it is clear she has a strong sense of justice and is a girl who is considerate of her friends", citing things she had to be careful of when voicing Chiaki to be not to talk too fast or too much, and to speak slowly as if she were thinking about what she was saying as she was saying it, while speeding up her dialogue flow on the subject of video games. In English, Chiaki is voiced by Christine Marie Cabanos.

== Appearances ==
=== In video games ===
Chiaki is the main heroine of the video game Danganronpa 2: Goodbye Despair. Initially presenting as a sleepy, laid-back student who is inexperienced in the ways of the world but very skilled at video games, she becomes a central figure of the class trials along with Hajime Hinata, most notably the second one when she assists him in connecting a murder case with the video game Twilight Syndrome, which robotic bear Monokuma had offered the students to play to understand how the culprit and victims were related. When the rebellious Nagito Komaeda tries to destroy the islands upon learning the truth of his identity and their true location, Chiaki accidentally kills Nagito by throwing poison at him to put out a fire surrounding him, with Nagito arranging the scene in advance to look as if he had committed suicide according to his plan to ensure her survival alone and the execution of the other students at the subsequent class trial. Thwarting Nagito's plans by confessing her identity to the other students as one of those to have trapped them on Jabberwock Island. Addressing Usami as her sister and hoping their father would be proud of them, Chiaki is then executed alongside Usami by getting crushed by a Tetris block in order to save the remaining students. It is learned during the subsequent graduation ceremony that Jabberwock Island exists in a virtual reality created by the Neo World Program, and that Chiiaki (alongside Usami and Alter Ego) was actually one of three AI programs created by her "dad", the late Chihiro Fujisaki (a character from the previous Danganronpa game), programmed to observe and protect the students (in actuality members of the Ultimate Despair organisation rendered amnesiac) during rogue Future Foundation agent and killing game survivor Makoto Naegi's rehabilitation experiment. However, a remnant of her consciousness remains intact long enough to allow her to help Hajime during his final conflict with the AI of Junko Enoshima controlling Monokuma (whom he had inserted into the programme before being memory-wiped) who threatens the surviving students with either sealing them forever in the islands or turning them into her replicas.

Chiaki appears in the sixth and final chapter of Danganronpa V3: Killing Harmony as a persona adopted by the new mastermind, the Danganronpa V3: Killing Harmony reality television showrunner, alongside those of the cast of Trigger Happy Havoc and Goodbye Despair, as well as a part of the game's post story content mode, the "Ultimate Talent Development Plan", in which the player can interact with the entire cast from the franchise; Chiaki's individual storyline referencing her connection to Chihiro. Chiaki reappears in Danganronpa S: Ultimate Summer Camp, an expanded version of the "Ultimate Talent Development Plan" released as a part of the Danganronpa Decadence bundle in 2021.

=== In other media ===
In the anime series Danganronpa 3: The End of Hope's Peak High School, it is revealed that the Chiaki computer program was based on a human student who attended Hope's Peak Academy, the game-loving Ultimate who befriended Hajime Hinata before he chose to become Izuru Kamukura. She is later skewered to death, leading to Izuru deciding to take on a neutral role in the coming war. In the final scene of "Goodbye, Hope's Peak Academy", the A.I. Chiaki appears with Nagito and Hajime reenacting the first scene of Goodbye Despair. In the series finale "The School of Hope and the Students of Despair", Izuru finally bids farewell to their memory of Chiaki and her human counterpart, as he embraces a sense of purpose for the first time with the restored and rehabilitated Remnants of Despair.

Chiaki appears in two manga adaptations of Goodbye Despair, one of which partially retold from her perspective, and the other of a non-canonical anthology format. Chiaki also appears as a guest character in a 2021 crossover event between Identity V and Danganronpa as an alternate skin for the player character, with the option of being chased by Monokuma. A tie-in figurine of the character was also created, alongside one of Nagito Komaeda.

== Critical reception ==
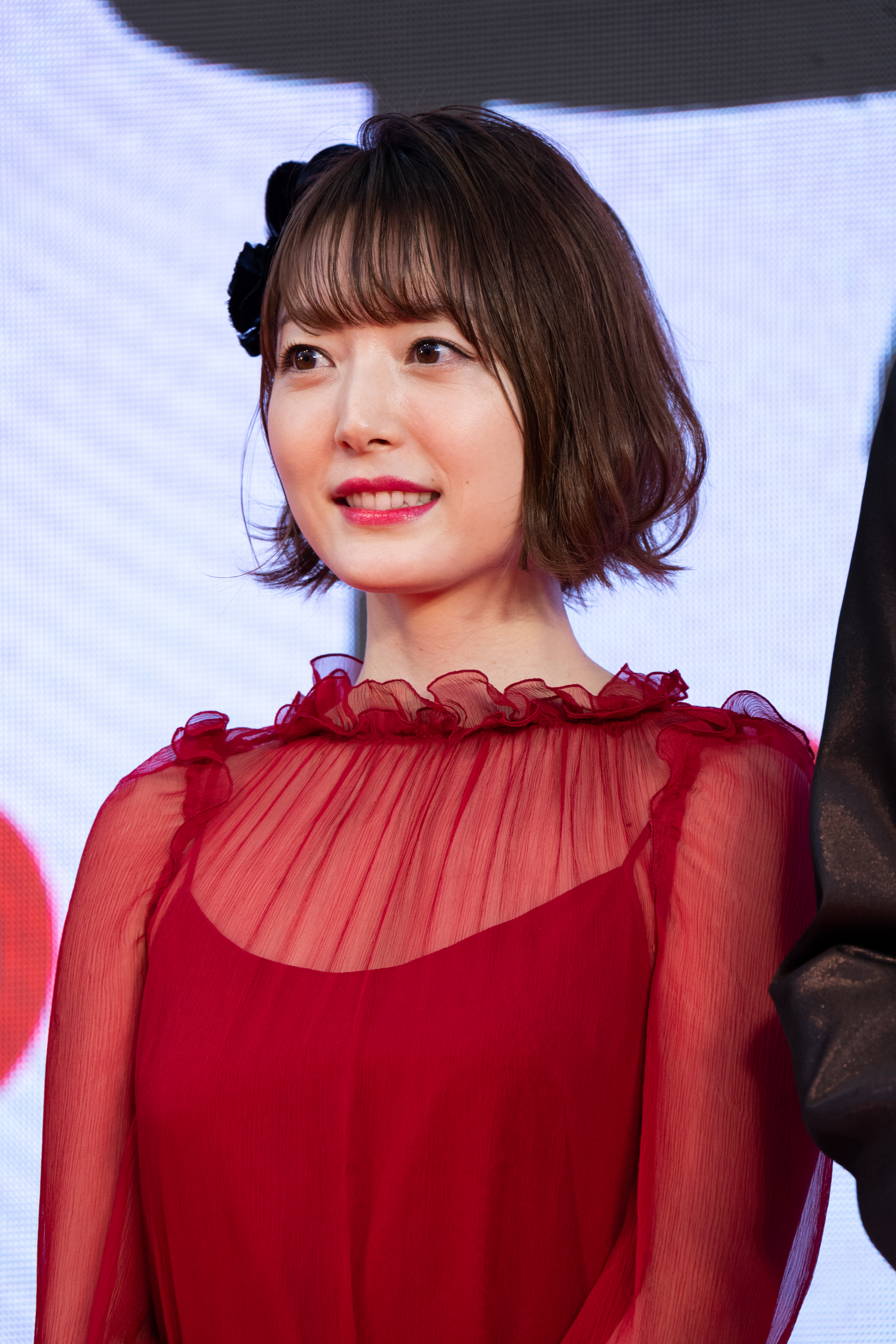
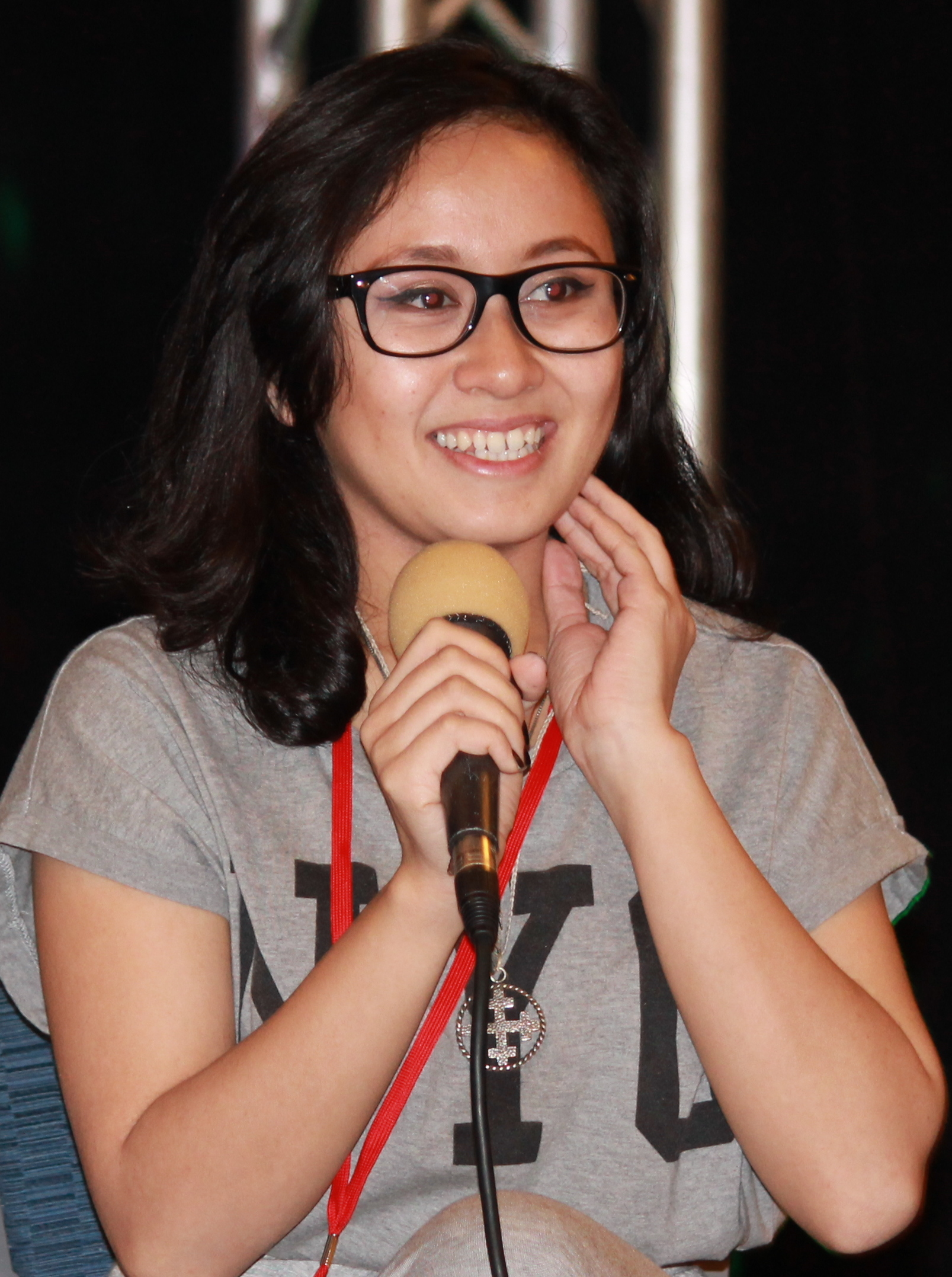
Kana Hanazawa (left) and Christine Marie Cabanos (right) voiced Chiaki in Japanese and English, respectively

Chiaki's role in the original Goodbye Despair game earned praise. Comic Book Resources regarded Chiaki as one of the best characters from Goodbye Despair due to how she shows off her gaming skills and the growing relationship between her and Hajime after they met on the island. The Gamer listed her as the fifth best Danganronpa character based on her calm personality and "selfless" heroic actions in Goodbye Despair due to how she aids Hajime and the rest of her friends to leave the virtual world. In a popularity poll from the franchise for the collected release of Trigger Happy Havoc and Goodbye Despair, Chiaki reached the fifth spot. To celebrate, Rui Komatsuzaki did an illustration of the top five to be featured in the re-release of the games, Reload. Rice Digital regarded Chiaki as one of their favorite Danganronpa characters alongside Nagito, making her accidental murder of this character shock the writer when playing the game. Her return in the finale of the game to aid Hajime despite being revealed as an AI also attracted the writer. He added "To know that she was always the hope and that she was developed specifically to lead the cast of Danganronpa 2 to fight against Junko makes it even more of a bitter ending for our beloved gamer girl." Koi-Nya referred to Chiaki as one of the best Danganronpa 2 characters based on hear traits and important actions in the narrative, most notably her assistance in the fight against Junko's AI.

Chiaki's incarnation from the anime earned praised by Manga.Tokyo for standing out in the early Despair Arc episodes where she uses her skills as a gamer to have fun with the rest of the cast to the point of feeling like the main character of the second episode. enjoyed the bond that both Hajime and Chiaki had in the anime. Fandom Post went to say that Hajime's decision to hang with "Chiaki, which is both symbolic of his frustration and sad to me, because Hinata and Chiaki's relationship in this show has been absolutely adorable to watch." Many felt their relationship became tragic when Hajime nearly lost his humanity, to the point where he could not react to her death. Biggest in Japan regarded the inclusion of an "original" Chiaki Nanami as one of the biggest twists in the Danganronpa 3 anime in early episodes due to her persona from the video game not being actual Chiaki which leaves a feeling of mystery especially as if her death could bring a major impact in the narrative. The writer said "While it's great to discover that one of the most memorable Danganronpa 2 characters has been granted a [brief] new lease on life for Danganronpa 3, what really excites me about her appearance are the implications she brings to the story." There was also commentary with regard to the nearly emotionless Izuru reacting to the death of the original Chiaki, which came across as an important emotional scene, as Izuru starts crying when seeing her in her last moments.

The voice actresses behind Chiaki were also praised. In describing the "dream" Japanese cast of Goodbye Despair, Kotaku remarked on Kana Hanazawa's work, mostly due to her work in Psycho-Pass as Akane Tsunemori which would attract fans from such series. In a poll by AnimeAnime, Chiaki was voted as the 14th best Hanazawa character specifically for her role in the anime series. James Beckett from Anime News Network praised Christine Marie Cabanos's work as Chiaki for providing a good performance especially in the late episodes during a sad scene. In a 2021 poll, Chiaki was voted as the second best Danganronpa character.

== See also ==
- List of Danganronpa characters
  - "Chiaki Nanami"
