= Christine Marie Cabanos =

American voice actress

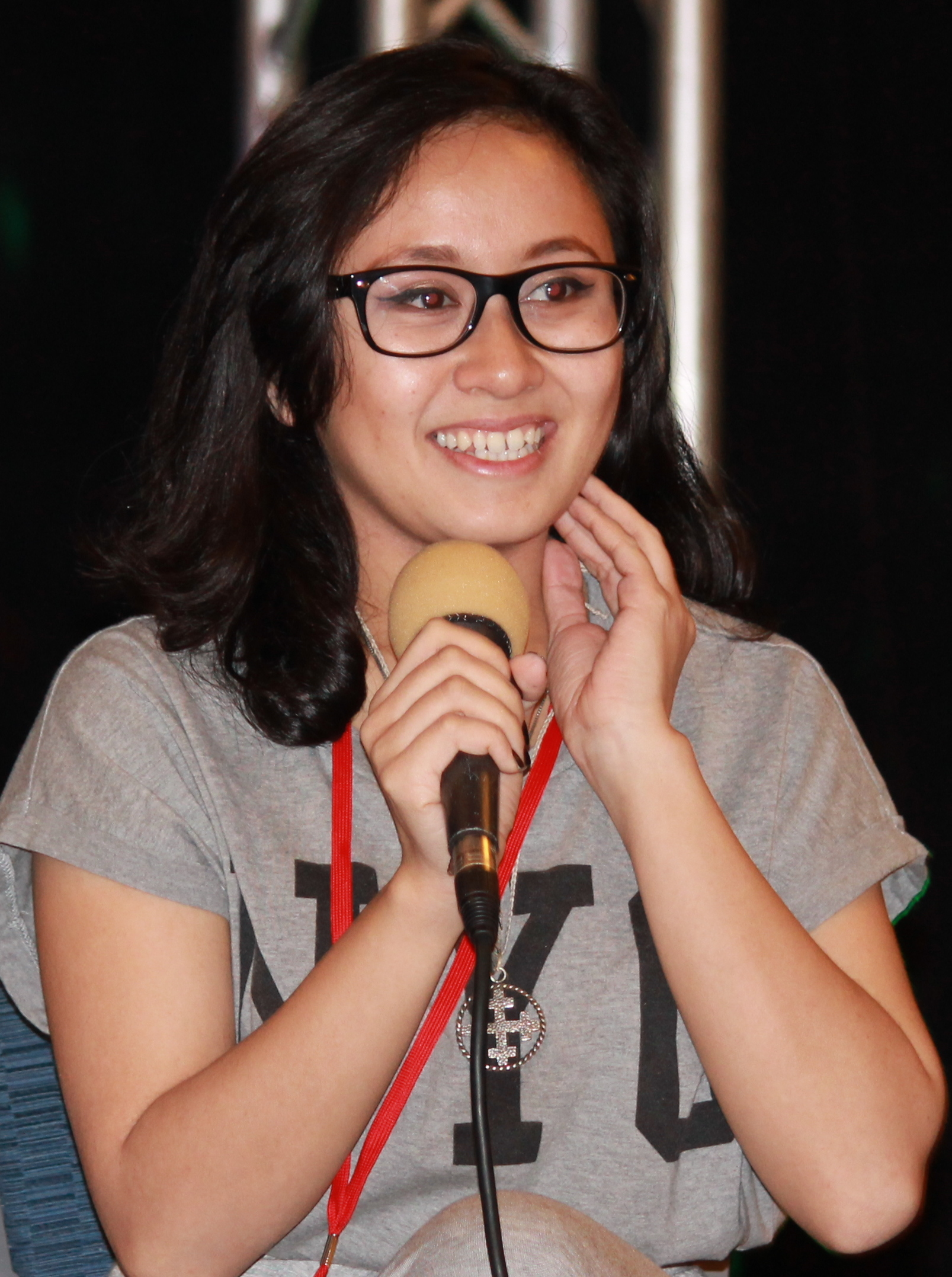
- Cabanos at Animate Florida in 2014
- Born: United States
- Education: California State University, Fullerton
- Occupation: Voice actress
- Years active: 2010–present
- Partner: Oscar Garcia
- Children: 1

Christine Marie Cabanos is an American voice actress of Filipino descent. Some of her roles include Azusa Nakano in K-On!, the titular characters in Squid Girl and Puella Magi Madoka Magica, Mako Mankanshoku in Kill la Kill, Hisone Amakasu in Dragon Pilot: Hisone and Masotan, Hotaru Tomoe/Sailor Saturn from the Viz Media redub of Sailor Moon, Shiemi Moriyama in Blue Exorcist, Silica in Sword Art Online, and Minori Kushieda in Toradora!. In video games, she voices Nepgear in the Hyperdimension Neptunia series, Chiaki Nanami and Himiko Yumeno in the Danganronpa series, Filia and Fukua in Skullgirls, Amitie in Puyo Puyo Tetris, Elec-Tron in Vitamin Connection, as well as the Poplins in Super Mario Bros. Wonder.

== Personal life ==
In an interview with Crunchyroll, Cabanos revealed she grew up watching cartoons, watching Nickelodeon and Disney animated shows and movies. Cabanos revealed Christine Cavanaugh, who voiced Chuckie Finster in Nickelodeon's Rugrats, was her inspiration to become a voice actor.

In January 2020, Cabanos announced via her Instagram, that on a vacation in the Philippines, she got engaged to her long-time partner, Oscar Garcia. As of 2021, the two have one child together.

== Filmography ==
=== Anime ===
List of voice performances in anime
Year	Title	Role	Notes	Source
2011–12	K-On!	Azusa Nakano	Also OVA and movie	
2011	Squid Girl	Squid Girl		
2011	Rozen Maiden: Ouvertüre	Sara		
2012–15	Puella Magi Madoka Magica	Madoka Kaname	Also movie	
2012	Mahoromatic: I'm Home	Minawa Andou		Resume
2012–13	Blue Exorcist	Shiemi Moriyama		
2013–14	Lagrange: The Flower of Rin-ne	Michi Kondo		Resume
2013–present	Sword Art Online series	Keiko Ayano / Silica	3 TV series	Resume
2013	Pokémon Origins	Reina, Caterpie, Pidgey, Mew		
2013	Accel World	Ruka Asato (Lagoon Dolphin)		Resume
2013	Tamagotchi Friends	Yumemitchi		Resume
2014	Magi: The Labyrinth of Magic	Pisti, Sai Lin, Nadja	Also Kingdom	Resume
2014	Toradora!	Minori Kushieda		
2014–15	Kill la Kill	Mako Mankanshoku	Also OVA	
2015	Yuki Yuna is a Hero	Sonoko Nogi		Resume
2015	Hyperdimension Neptunia: The Animation	Nepgear (Purple Sister)	First Funimation role	
2015–16	Aldnoah.Zero	Nina Klein		
2016	Love Live!	Yukiho Kousaka		
2016	Cyborg 009 VS Devilman	Ivan Whisky / Cyborg 001, Helena	OVA series	
2016	Tales of Zestiria the X	Symonne		
2016	Danganronpa 3: The End of Hope's Peak High School	Chiaki Nanami	Despair Arc	
2016	Mobile Suit Gundam: Iron-Blooded Orphans	Almiria Bauduin		Tweet
2016–17	Erased	Hiromi Sugita		
2016–17	Kuromukuro	Rita		
2017–19	Sailor Moon	Hotaru Tomoe / Sailor Saturn, Mistress 9	Viz dub First Studiopolis role	
2017	Blue Exorcist: Kyoto Saga	Shiemi Moriyama		
2017	Skip Beat!	Mimori Nanokura		
2018	Violet Evergarden	Erica Brown		
2018	FLCL: Progressive	Aiko		
2018	Re:Zero − Starting Life in Another World	Felt		
2018	Dragon Pilot: Hisone and Masotan	Hisone Amakasu		
2019	Isekai Quartet	Felt		
2019	Neon Genesis Evangelion	Maya Ibuki	Netflix re-dub	
2019	Demon Slayer: Kimetsu no Yaiba	Kiriya Ubuyashiki(Black-haired guide)		
2019	Teasing Master Takagi-san	Mano	Season 2	
2019	One Piece	Rebecca		Tweet
2019	Inazuma Eleven: Ares	Aurelia Dingle		
2020	Drifting Dragons	Capella		
2022	Magia Record	Madoka Kaname	Season 2	

=== Animation ===
List of voice performances in animation
Year	Title	Role	Notes	Source
2011	Secret Millionaires Club	Elena's Sisters	Ep. "Be Cool to Your School"	
2017–18	Zak Storm	Cece Lejune		
2018	Wakfu	Amalia	Season 3	
2020	Recorded by Arizal	Arizal		
2025	Pretty Pretty Please I Don't Want to be a Magical Girl	Hoshi		

=== Film ===
List of voice performances in feature films
Year	Title	Role	Notes	Source
2011	K-ON! The Movie	Azusa Nakano	English dub	
2013	Blue Exorcist: The Movie	Shiemi Moriyama	Limited theatrical release	
2017	Sword Art Online The Movie: Ordinal Scale	Keiko Ayano / Silica	Limited theatrical release	
2018	Lu over the Wall	Lu	English dub	
2019	Evangelion Death (True)^{2}	Maya Ibuki	Netflix dub	
2019	The End of Evangelion	Maya Ibuki	Netflix dub	
2020	Violet Evergarden: Eternity and the Auto Memory Doll	Erica Brown, additional Voices	English dub	
2021	Violet Evergarden: The Movie	Erica Brown	English dub	
2021	Sword Art Online Progressive: Aria of a Starless Night	Keiko Ayano / Silica	Limited theatrical release	
2021	Pretty Guardian Sailor Moon Eternal The Movie	Hotaru Tomoe/Super Sailor Saturn	Netflix dub	
2023	Pretty Guardian Sailor Moon Cosmos	Hotaru Tomoe/Eternal Sailor Saturn	Netflix Dub	

List of voice performances in direct-to-video and television films
Year	Title	Role	Notes	Source
2011	Redline	Alien Child, Chicken Scalper, Princess		Resume
2012	Oblivion Island: Haruka and the Magic Mirror	Haruka		
2014	Pororo, The Racing Adventure	Loopy	Uncredited	Resume
2016	Lego Friends: Girlz 4 Life	Megan		Resume

=== Video games ===
List of voice performances in video games
Year	Title	Role	Notes	Source
2012	Hyperdimension Neptunia Mk2	Nepgear (Purple Sister)	Also Re;Birth 2	
2012	Skullgirls	Filia		
2012	Atelier Meruru: The Apprentice of Arland	Keina Swaya	Also Atelier Meruru Plus	Resume
2013	Hyperdimension Neptunia Victory	Nepgear	Also Re;Birth 3	Resume
2013	Ragnarok Online 2: Legend of the Second	Female Noel		Tweet
2013	Disney Princess Palace Pets	Bloom		
2013	Time and Eternity	Wedi		Resume
2013	Dead or Alive 5 Ultimate	Marie Rose	Also Last Round	Facebook
2014	The Witch and the Hundred Knight	Theresa, Korigon, Mittens		Resume
2014	Mugen Souls Z	Tioni		Resume
2014	Hyperdimension Neptunia: Producing Perfection	Nepgear (Purple Sister)		Resume
2014	Danganronpa 2: Goodbye Despair	Chiaki Nanami		Resume
2014	Fairy Fencer F	Karin, Emily	Also Advent Dark Force	Press
2015	Hyperdevotion Noire: Goddess Black Heart	Wyn		Resume
2015	Omega Quintet	Pet		Tweet
2015	Hyperdimension Neptunia U: Action Unleashed	Nepgear (Purple Sister)		Resume
2015	Lord of Magna: Maiden Heaven	Gabrielle, Ingrid		
2015	Disgaea 5: Alliance of Vengeance	Usalia		
2015	Tales of Zestiria	Symonne		Tweet
2015	Stella Glow	Lisette		
2015	Xenoblade Chronicles X	Additional voices		
2016	MegaTagmension Blanc + Neptune VS Zombies	Nepgear (Purple Sister)		Resume
2016	Atelier Sophie: The Alchemist of the Mysterious Book	Sophie Neuenmuller		Tweet
2016	Megadimension Neptunia VII	Nepgear (Purple Sister)		Resume
2016	Superdimension Neptune VS Sega Hard Girls	Nepgear (Purple Sister)		Resume
2016	God Eater: Resurrection	Female Custom Voice #1		Tweet
2017	Persona 5	Shiho Suzui		Tweet
2017	Puyo Puyo Tetris	Amitie		Tweet
2017	Fire Emblem Echoes: Shadows of Valentia	Delthea		Tweet
2017	Danganronpa V3: Killing Harmony	Himiko Yumeno		Tweet
2017	Mary Skelter: Nightmares	Snow White		Tweet
2017	Cyberdimension Neptunia: 4 Goddesses Online	Nepgear		Resume
2018	Monster Prom	Miranda Vanderbilt, Hope		Tweet
2018	Megadimension Neptunia VIIR	Nepgear (Purple Sister)		Resume
2019	Pokémon Masters	Acerola		
2019	Conception Plus: Maidens of the Twelve Stars	Collette		
2020	Fire Emblem: Three Houses	Hapi	Cindered Shadows DLC	Tweet
2020	Vitamin Connection	Elec-Tron		Tweet
2021	Re:Zero − Starting Life in Another World: The Prophecy of the Throne	Felt		In-game credits
2021	Story of Seasons: Pioneers of Olive Town	Additional voices		In-game credits
2021	Akiba's Trip: Hellbound & Debriefed	Sara		In-game credits
2021	Tales of Arise	Rinwell		Tweet
2021	Demon Slayer: Kimetsu no Yaiba – The Hinokami Chronicles	Black-Haired Guide		
2022	Rune Factory 5	Livia		In-game credits
2022	Fire Emblem Warriors: Three Hopes	Hapi		In-game credits
2023	Super Mario Bros. Wonder	Poplins		Tweet
2024	Puyo Puyo Puzzle Pop	Amitie, additional voices		
2026	Code Vein II	Protagonist		
2026	Arknights: Endfield	Purrchena		
2027	Danganronpa 2×2	Chiaki Nanami		

Preceded by Jen Gould	Voice of Sailor Saturn; 2016-present	Succeeded by None
