= Arizal =

Arizal may refer to:

- Isaac Luria, or ARIZaL (1534–1572), Jewish mystic
- Arizal (director) (1943–2014), Indonesian film director
- Arizal Effendi (1949–2008), Indonesian diplomat
- Arizal, a character in the 2020 American animated series Recorded by Arizal
- Arizal, Jammu and Kashmir, a village in India
