= Danganronpa Another Episode: Ultra Despair Girls =

2014 video game

- Cover art featuring Monokuma (bottom) and silhouettes of Komaru Naegi and Toko Fukawa (center left and right, respectively)
- Developer: Spike Chunsoft (Note: Additional work by Shade)
- Publishers: JP: Spike Chunsoft; WW: NIS America (until 2020) (Note: NIS America originally published the PlayStation 4 and PlayStation Vita versions outside of Japan. Spike Chunsoft has published the Windows version internationally since release and took over NIS' digital publishing duties for the Vita and PS4 in 2020.)
- Directors: Shun Sasaki; Kazutaka Kodaka
- Producer: Yoshinori Terasawa
- Artists: Hirofune Hane; Rui Komatsuzaki
- Writers: Kazutaka Kodaka; Yōichirō Koizumi
- Composer: Masafumi Takada
- Series: Danganronpa
- Platforms: PlayStation Vita, PlayStation 4, Windows
- Release: September 25, 2014: PlayStation Vita; JP: September 25, 2014; NA: September 1, 2015; EU: September 4, 2015; AU: September 10, 2015 PlayStation 4; EU: June 23, 2017; NA: June 27, 2017; JP: June 29, 2017 Windows; WW: June 27, 2017
- Genres: Action-adventure, third-person shooter
- Mode: Single-player

Danganronpa Another Episode: Ultra Despair Girls (Note: Known in Japan as Zettai Zetsubō Shōjo: Danganronpa Another Episode (Japanese: 絶対絶望少女 ダンガンロンパ Another Episode, Hepburn: Zettai Zetsubō Shōjo: Danganronpa Anazā Episōdo; lit. 'Absolute Despair Girls: Bullet Refutation Another Episode')) is an action-adventure and third-person shooter video game developed by Spike Chunsoft. It is a spin-off in the Danganronpa series, set in between the events of Danganronpa: Trigger Happy Havoc and Danganronpa 2: Goodbye Despair. The game was originally published by Spike Chunsoft for the PlayStation Vita in Japan on September 25, 2014, and internationally by NIS America in September 2015. Ports for the PlayStation 4 and Windows were released in June 2017.

Although different in gameplay to its murder mystery visual novel predecessors, Ultra Despair Girls retains the series' visual style and focus on narrative. The player controls Komaru Naegi—the younger sister of the first game's protagonist, Makoto Naegi—and Toko Fukawa, a returning character with dissociative identity disorder. Komaru is forced to participate in a death game within a city overtaken by murderous bear robots called Monokumas, and teams up with Toko to escape. Behind the Monokumas are the Warriors of Hope, a group of abused children who intend to massacre all adults and construct a safe haven for kids. In combat sections, the player uses a megaphone gun as Komaru to fight the robots; as Toko, they control her serial killer personality Genocide Jack, who fights using pairs of scissors. Other sections feature visual novel, puzzle, and stealth game elements.

Ultra Despair Girls was conceived by series creator Kazutaka Kodaka and producer Yoshinori Terasawa shortly after the completion of Danganronpa 2, while they took time to prepare for a third mainline installment. They wanted to differentiate the spin-off from the main entries and considered multiple genres before they settled on action-adventure, since they thought the movement-based gameplay would compliment the story. Due to a difficult development process, Ultra Despair Girls became the most expensive Danganronpa game at the time; several staff members described the project as stressful in regards to budget and scheduling.

The game was met with mixed reviews. Critics were divided on the gameplay; some thought it was a strange direction for the series, but others enjoyed the dynamics provided by different bullet types available for the megaphone gun. Several critics thought the game retained a high level of writing quality from previous Danganronpa games, although some had issues with the story's pacing. It was considered the darkest Danganronpa game for its portrayal of themes such as child sexual abuse. Commercially, Ultra Despair Girls had sold about 500,000 copies by 2021. The game spawned manga adaptations and an anime continuation through an episode of the TV show Danganronpa 3: The End of Hope's Peak High School (2016). Kodaka and co-director Shun Sasaki have indicated the possibility of a video game sequel.

== Gameplay ==
Komaru Naegi uses a Dance bullet on a Siren Monokuma, which attracts other nearby enemies. She then fires a Move bullet to activate an adjacent car, killing the entire group at once.

Unlike the mainline Danganronpa series of murder mystery visual novels, the spin-off Danganronpa Another Episode: Ultra Despair Girls is an action-adventure and third-person shooter video game. The player controls teenager Komaru Naegi in linear areas throughout a city overtaken by kids and an army of Monokuma robot bears, who massacre the city's adult population. Despite the change in genre, Ultra Despair Girls is still focused on narrative; in between the action-adventure segments, the player advances the story in visual novel-styled dialogue and cutscenes. The game is divided into chapters, which typically end with a boss fight against a mecha robot.

To fight the variations of Monokuma enemies, Komaru wields the Hacking Gun—a megaphone that shoots Truth Bullets, which are projectiles of computer code that destroy or modify the behavior of the robots. The player acquires various types of ammunition for the megaphone throughout the story, which can be used on enemies or have environmental effects such as opening blocked paths. Break bullets damages Monokumas, Move activates machinery such as switches or cars to run over enemies, Dance temporarily stuns enemies by putting them into a dance, Detect acts as a light ray that allows the player to see puzzle clues or other secrets, Knockback will send enemies and objects flying backwards, Paralyze creates a field of electricity that can be used to damage multiple Monokumas at once, Burn sets enemies aflame and can be used in rapid fire, and Link allows the player to temporarily gain control of a Monokuma. Some of these are limited by an ammunition count, whereas others such as Move can be used indefinitely. The player encounters a variety of Monokuma enemies throughout the story, which are susceptible to different Truth Bullets. For example, Guard Monokumas use a shield that can be countered with Knockback, and using Dance on alarm-equipped Siren Monokumas will lure other nearby enemies.

Komaru is accompanied by Toko Fukawa, a girl with dissociative identity disorder. On a limited timer represented by batteries, the player can control Toko's serial killer personality Genocide Jack, who fights using pairs of scissors, is invincible to enemy attacks, and deals greater damage than Komaru. As the player defeats enemies using Genocide Jack, she will charge up a fever gauge that can be used to unleash special attacks and combos. Unlike Genocide Jack, Komaru runs on a health bar; a game over is produced if her health reaches zero, though she can be saved by Toko if the player has at least one Genocide Jack battery and succeeds at a quick time event. Some sections deviate from combative gameplay and feature stealth and puzzle game elements. The player can also encounter Monoku-Man arcade machines, which will give access to an overhead camera view of an upcoming room with enemies. The camera offers clues to how the player can try to destroy or avoid all Monokumas without being spotted; successfully doing so increases the score received at the end of the chapter.

Throughout the city, the player can find "MonoMono" gashapon machines and gift boxes that award megaphone ammunition, hearts that replenish health, or batteries for Genocide Jack. Monokumas drop "MonoCoins" upon death, which can be used to purchase upgrades for Komaru and Toko at shops that are scattered throughout the city. A levelling system incremented by defeating Monokumas increases Komaru's skill points, which allows the player to equip more upgrades. The game includes several collectibles for the player to find. While not consequential to the story, they provide background on the game's setting and additional dialogue among characters. The collectibles include notes left by victims of the tragedy in the city, additional upgrades for Komaru and Toko, and manga sidestories.

== Plot ==
Ultra Despair Girls takes place in between the events of Danganronpa: Trigger Happy Havoc (released 2010) and 2: Goodbye Despair (2012). It follows Komaru Naegi, an energetic but simple-minded ordinary high schooler who is the little sister of the first game's protagonist, Makoto Naegi. At the start of the Tragedy—a global societal collapse instigated by the terrorist organization Ultimate Despair, led by Junko Enoshima—Komaru is kidnapped by Junko's followers and confined to an apartment complex in Towa City, an artificial island created and administered by the conglomerate Towa Group. After one and a half years in captivity without knowledge of the outside world, her door is suddenly broken down by a murderous Monokuma robot. Komaru flees to the outside of her room and is saved by Byakuya Togami, a survivor from Trigger Happy Havoc and now an agent for the Future Foundation—a non-governmental organization aiming to restore the world from the effects of the Tragedy. Byakuya gives Komaru the Hacking Gun and orders her to flee, while he stays behind and fights the remaining Monokumas in the apartment.

As the outside city is attacked by swarms of Monokumas, Komaru is guided to an escape helicopter by Future Foundation agents. The escape is intercepted by Monokumas who abduct her and place her onbaord the Excalibur, a flying cruise ship where she meets Nagito Komaeda, a servant and slave working under the Warriors of Hope, a group of five children affiliated with an elementary school branch of Hope's Peak Academy responsible for the riots in Towa City, whose goal is to genocide all adults and create a utopia for children. They force Komaru to take part in the Demon Hunting Game—a death game where they will compete to kill her—and send her back into the city. Komaru finds herself cornered by Monokumas, but is saved by Toko Fukawa's alter, a serial killer named Genocide Jack. She soon reverts to the persecutory deluded Toko Fukawa, another survivor from the first game and intern at the Future Foundation who is infatuated with Byakuya. Although Toko takes a repulsive attitude towards Komaru for her airheadedness, they team up to venture into the city.

Throughout their exploration, Komaru and Toko fight the Warriors of Hope and learn of the traumas that led to their hatred of adults. Lil' Ultimate PE Masaru Daimon was physically abused by his alcoholic father; Lil' Ultimate Art Jataro Kemuri was berated by his mother to the point of extreme self-hatred; child actor Lil' Ultimate Drama Kotoko Utsugi was sexually abused by producers at the bequest of her parents; Lil' Ultimate Social Studies Nagisa Shingetsu was overworked and drugged by his parents to improve his performance in school; and Lil' Ultimate Homeroom Monaca Towa, the illegitimate child of Towa Corporation's president, was outcast from her family. The five kids planned to commit group suicide but were stopped by Junko, who taught them to hate and murder adults.

Komaru and Toko are aided by a seemingly friendly Monokuma named Shirokuma to an underground resistance, led by Towa family member Haiji; however, he rejects their help due to Toko's affiliation with the Future Foundation, who he despises. After an excursion to contact Makoto, Komaru and Toko return to find the resistance under attack from Monokumas. Despite casualties, they assist in repelling the ambush and Haiji agrees to help the pair.

Supported by the resistance, Komaru and Toko advance into the Warriors of Hope's headquarters. They fight and destroy a mecha controlled by Monaca and the Warriors of Hope's advisor, a Monokuma named Kurokuma. Monaca reveals that her true goal is to turn Komaru, the Ultimate Hope's little sister who defeated Junko, into Junko's successor by having her destroy the Monokuma controller that would detonate the bombs in the helmets brainwashing all of the other children in the city. Pressured by a vengeful Haiji and the Resistance who don't care that the brainwashed children will die, Komaru finally falls into despair when Monaca claims to have murdered her parents, but Toko convinces her to not give in. After a battle with a Godzilla-sized Monokuma controlled by the traitorous Shirokuma, Monaca is left alone under a pile of rubble whilst Komaru and Toko rescue Byakuya, who had been captured at the start of the game. To prevent the outbreak of another war and to search for the true fate of her parents, Komaru chooses to stay behind in Towa City; as a token of their friendship, Toko decides to join her. Monaca is rescued by Nagito, who promises to set her up as Junko's successor in order to birth a new hope through war and despair. Shirokuma and Kurokuma are revealed to contain an artificial intelligence of Junko's consciousness. Data chips of the two robots are taken by Junko's ally Izuru Kamukura, who uses these to attempt to start a killing game in Danganronpa 2. An image shown during the credits reveals that the other four Warriors of Hope have separated from Monaca and survived together.

== Development ==
A spin-off in the Danganronpa series was greenlit shortly after the completion of development on Danganronpa 2: Goodbye Despair. Producer Yoshinori Terasawa perceived that series creator and lead writer Kazutaka Kodaka needed time to "cool off" and come up with ideas for a third mainline entry, so he suggested they create a spin-off in the meantime. Ultra Despair Girls was developed by Spike Chunsoft in cooperation with another studio, Shade. Kodaka directed the game with project planner Shun Sasaki and wrote the scenario alongside novelist Yōichirō Koizumi, while Terasawa served as producer.

The project ended up proving stressful for the staff. Kodaka wrote in his Famitsu-serialized column Zettai Zetsubō Kodaka that the team cycled through several ideas without seeing an increase in quality and that many members of the staff left and joined throughout development. Issues led to gradual increases to the budget; according to Kodaka, the project became the most expensive entry in the Danganronpa series at the time. The game's artbook includes interviews with members of the staff, asking what part of production caused them the greatest despair. Terasawa responded: "The scheduling. The budget. Or the feeling that nobody listened to anything I said. The workplace was a storm of despair!" Project manager Tatsuya Marutani said: "There's too much to mention; I can't really summarize [the despair] in a few words. We definitely didn't have an organized process, but I feel accomplished that we made it work." Kodaka similarly expressed pride over the product despite difficulties.

=== Game design ===
A change in genre was decided since Kodaka found it uninteresting to reuse the previous titles' mechanics in a non-numbered entry. Although he had always wished to write for an action-adventure game, other genres were also discussed. A Mario Kart-esque racing game featuring Danganronpa characters was an idea pushed quite enthusiastically by a few developers, even though Terasawa firmly rejected this. In a 2020 livestream celebrating the series' tenth anniversary, he laughed: "I was like, no way we should do that." Ultimately, the action-adventure genre—which are more movement-focused than visual novels—was chosen based upon the premise of the main characters running from despair and escaping Towa City.

Co-director Shun Sasaki collaborated with a concept artist to brainstorm possible settings. Early ideas emphasized survival game aspects (top left), greater agility (top right), and directly chasing a mastermind villain (bottom left), before they settled on allowing the player to fight the Monokumas (bottom right).

Even with the genre determined, details about the story and gameplay were still pending, so Sasaki worked with a concept artist to flesh out the new setting. The first artwork inspired Sasaki to incorporate survival aspects: the game would feature the main characters running around the town and trying to survive. The second concept was high-action and would give Komaru more agility to escape Monokumas, such as running on walls. Both ideas were combined in the third: Komaru would run away from enemies while simultaneously chasing a mastermind. After concluding that none of these would be fun in practice, the developers finally settled on having the player fight the Monokumas. In early development, the game was called Ultimate Death Girls (Note: Zettai Zetsumei Shōjo (Japanese: 絶体絶命少女)) to emphasize its survival aspects, but was renamed to Ultra Despair Girls. The titles are a reference to the Disaster Report series, which is called Zettai Zetsumei Toshi (lit. 'Ultimate Death City') in Japan.

Truth Bullets and the Hacking Gun were designed as alternative to standard combat; normal fighting would have been "boring", according to Sasaki. At first, the game only featured standard Monokumas, but variations were introduced alongside the development of additional bullet types, in an attempt to encourage different strategies. To not intimidate the Japanese fanbase consisting primarily of visual novel fans, the developers believed that the shooter elements should be light in difficulty, so they introduced the ability to switch from Komaru to the stronger Genocide Jack for the accessibility of less experienced players. Three difficulty modes were developed to accommodate different playstyles, including the hardest Despair Mode for those seeking difficulty and the easiest Genocide Mode for players only interested in the story.

=== Visuals ===
"Set in a dystopian future, violence is a part of the game's environment as much as any set piece. Bloody corpses litter the street, children commit murder for fun, and robot bears are killing people around every corner. Most of the characters the player interacts with showcase some of the worst traits in people, ranging from insulting and bullying to cruel and violent."

— Common Sense Media's David Chapman on the environments and character writing of Ultra Despair Girls.

Despite changes in gameplay, Ultra Despair Girls retains many stylistic choices from past Danganronpa games, including a vibrant color-scheme. "Psycho-pop"—a term coined by Kodaka that serves as the series' stylistic identity (Note: In a 2015 interview with USgamer, Kodaka described the style as "gruesome and horrific" with a "pop" visual flair.)—was modified to "psycho-pop horror" in the game, according to a pre-release report from Famitsu. In a video interview with The Gamer Access, Terasawa named anime, manga, and films such as Battle Royale (2000) and Saw (2004) as inspirations. Hirofune Hane served as Ultra Despair Girls' art director and Rui Komatsuzaki returned as character designer.

Throughout Towa City, corpses line the streets in pools of blood. Like in previous games, all blood is colored hot-pink, while the bodies of murdered adults are bright monochrome blue or pink (for males and females, respectively) and without defining facial features or characteristics.

Anime cutscenes were directed by Seiji Kishi at the studio Lerche, the same animation team which previously worked on the TV adaptation Danganronpa: The Animation (2013).

=== Writing and characters ===
When scripting Ultra Despair Girls, Kodaka said that he spent equal time writing the villains as he did writing the main characters in the mainline installments. Since he believed the game ended up with a different mood and style of story to the previous games, he was worried about showing the plot to other staff members, but was relieved when they told him: "It's Danganronpa, all right."

The cast of characters went through several revisions during development. Originally, Komaru was intended to be partnered with Haiji Towa instead of Toko. At this point in development, Haiji was an assassin named Haiji Hakamori, who would fight enemies using a gun. The team eventually abandoned the gun concept; instead, he would be in constant pain whilst delivering strong punches using his casted arm, which would also be used in an important plot point according to Kodaka. Ultimately, they concluded that it would be risky to have both protagonists of a spin-off be new characters. According to Terasawa, they chose Toko to replace Haiji's role due to the potential offered by her dual personality and because she was one of the few alive Danganronpa characters capable of combat. The developers wanted to show her growth since Trigger Happy Havoc. Her design was made to look more feminine and adult in Ultra Despair Girls, and they considered how Genocide Jack's combat capabilities contrasted to Toko's weak mental health. Kodaka stated that her portrayal represented how people are changed by their situations. After Toko's introduction, the team reworked Haiji into a representation of the type of adults hated by kids.

Even with Toko's appearance, Terasawa believed that it would be better from a business point of view to feature another returning character in the story. He discussed with Kodaka about incorporating the second game's sub-antagonist Nagito Komaeda, who was a popular character with fans. However, Kodaka didn't accept the proposal on face value; on Kodaka's direction, Nagito is never referred to by name within Ultra Despair Girls. He only goes by "the Servant", which reflects the lack of humanity he receives from the Remnants of Despair. Unlike past villains who were designed with attributes that would make them likable by players, Kodaka wrote Monaca Towa to have zero redeemable qualities and wished players would dislike her. Other Warriors of Hope were designed and written after different stereotypes: Masaru Daimon as a PE kid, Kotoko Utsugi as a theatre kid, and Nagisa Shingetsu as a model student.

=== Audio ===
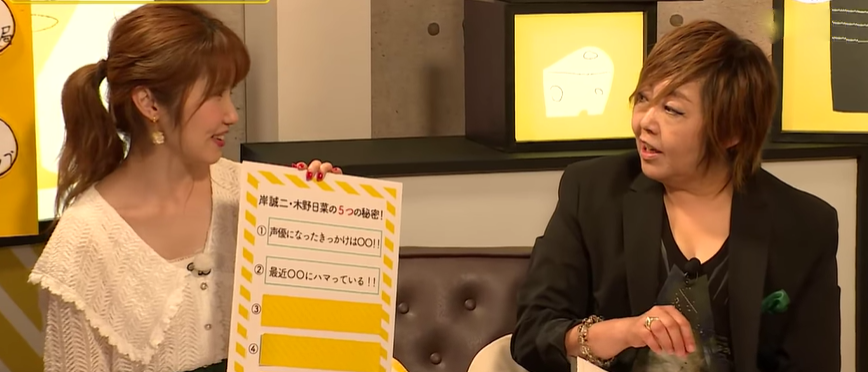
In the Japanese version, Aya Uchida (pictured left) voices Komaru and Megumi Ogata (right) reprises her roles as Makoto Naegi and Nagito Komaeda. They also perform the game's ending theme, "Progressive (Zenshin)".

In Japanese, the lead role of Ultra Despair Girls is voiced by Aya Uchida as Komaru Naegi. With previous Danganronpa protagonists, the development team favored actors who would surprise fans, but they selected Uchida for Ultra Despair Girls since they merely wished for a faithful portrayal of Komaru's character. A fan since the first game, Uchida was introduced to Danganronpa by her talent agency senior, Megumi Ogata, who voices both Makoto and Nagito. When her manager informed her that she had landed the role as Komaru, Uchida celebrated without hearing further details about the character. Although she initially thought Komaru was a minor character who would die early in the story, Uchida was later surprised to find she was the game's protagonist. The Japanese voice cast also reprises Miyuki Sawashiro as Toko and Genocide Jack, Ogata as Makoto and Nagito, and Akira Ishida as Byakuya. The English dub cast by Bang Zoom! includes Cherami Leigh as Komaru, Bennett Abara as Toko, Bryce Papenbrook as Makoto and Nagito, and Jason Wishnov as Byakuya.

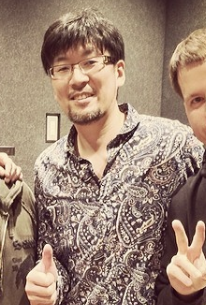
At the request of Kodaka, Masafumi Takada (pictured 2014) composed the soundtrack based upon 1980s electro-funk.

The soundtrack to Ultra Despair Girls was written by returning composer Masafumi Takada. Sound effects were handled by his usual collaborator Jun Fukuda, who Takada had previously brought in to perform guitar on the soundtracks to earlier Danganronpa games. Takada's score is predominantly electronic and includes new songs and rearrangements of tracks from previous games. The main theme is "Wonderful Dead", a pop-inspired track with hip-hop-styled nonsense vocals, which appears in five variants numbered from "001" to "005".

Kodaka requested that the soundtrack motif 1980s electro-funk music, so Takada experimented with this concept while attempting to retain the established atmosphere of past Danganronpa titles. In the game's artbook, Takada recalls that the most despair-inducing moment of production was when his main workstation broke down. He continued working using a spare laptop, but the issues caused a delay in the development of cutscenes, since the music was the last step in that process. Another problem occurred during the arrangement of synthesizers on "Ghost Stories from the School District of Revolution". Takada wanted to include a certain sound in the bridge, but had issues with his new setup. He had to use an old MacBook since he wanted to "[stick] to [his] guns". The 3-disc and 75-song soundtrack (including jingles and sound effects) was released by Takada's music label, Sound Prestige Records, on December 18, 2014, and peaked at number 299 on Oricon's Japanese albums chart.

As Komaru and Makoto, respectively, Uchida and Ogata perform vocals on the credits theme "Progressive (Zenshin)", a guitar rock song about not giving up on hope in the face of despair. The song was released as a CD single off the soundtrack by Lantis on January 28, 2015, and peaked at number 62 on the Oricon singles chart. As Nagito, Ogata performs the B-side, "Posion (Gekiyaku)". In the track, Nagito shows a mad obsession with hope by declaring that he would sacrifice his life for its sake.

== Release ==
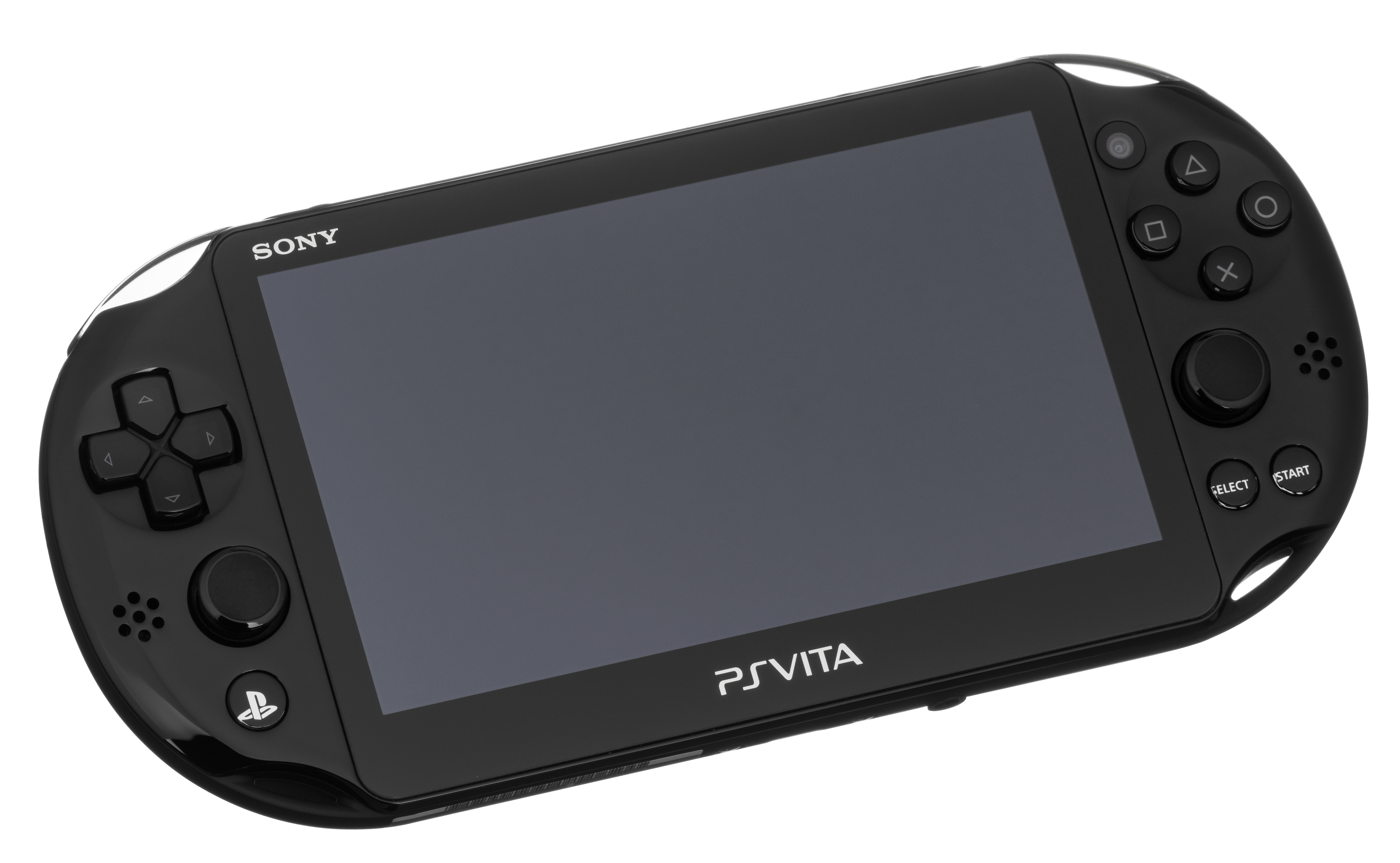
Ultra Despair Girls was originally released for the PlayStation Vita (pictured) in Japan on September 25, 2014.

Ultra Despair Girls was announced by Sony Interactive Entertainment at a press conference on September 9, 2013, alongside gameplay footage and the title. (Note: A third mainline entry (ambiguously Danganronpa V3: Killing Harmony or Danganronpa 3: The End of Hope's Peak High School) was teased at the end of the trailer with a short message: "and also... 3". Further details and formal announcements of these projects were not released until 2015.) In a subsequent December issue of Famitsu magazine, Kodaka explained that Ultra Despair Girls was still in development but the plot was "pretty much done". He recalled to VentureBeat in 2015 that there was a partly negative reaction to the game's announcement from the series' fanbase due to the different genre, but said that he enjoyed surprising people in that way. Danganronpa Another Episode: Ultra Despair Girls was released in Japan by Spike Chunsoft for the PlayStation Vita on September 25, 2014. To prevent spoilers, Spike Chunsoft prohibited players from sharing screenshots and videos past the game's first chapter. A page on Ultra Despair Girls' official website threatened that transgressors of the rule would be subject to childlike punishments, such as running barefoot on a gravel road or wiping their bottom with milk skin. Spike Chunsoft's marketing department ordered the removal of YouTube and Niconico videos which spoiled the game's ending.

An English localization of Ultra Despair Girls was announced in June 2015 by NIS America, who released it for the Vita in North America on September 1, 2015, in Europe on September 4, and in Australia on September 10. Ports of the game for PlayStation 4 and Windows computers via Steam were announced in November 2016. NIS America released the PlayStation 4 version in Europe on June 23, 2017, and in North America on June 27; Spike released it in Japan on June 29. The Steam version was published by Spike worldwide on June 27. In July 2020, the localized versions were temporarily removed from the PlayStation Store whilst Spike moved publishing rights from NIS America over to their newly established inhouse Western subsidiary.

=== Promotion ===
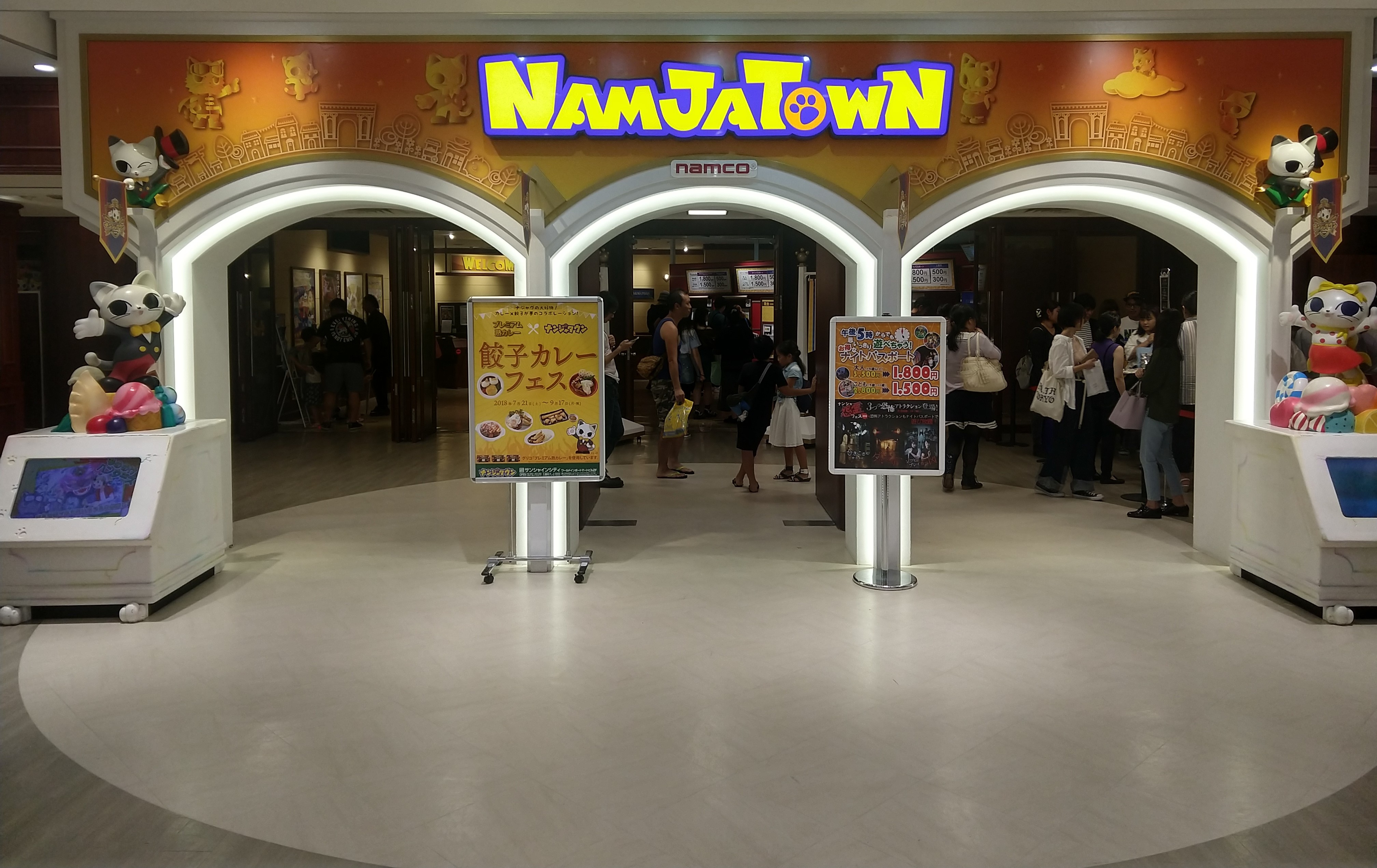
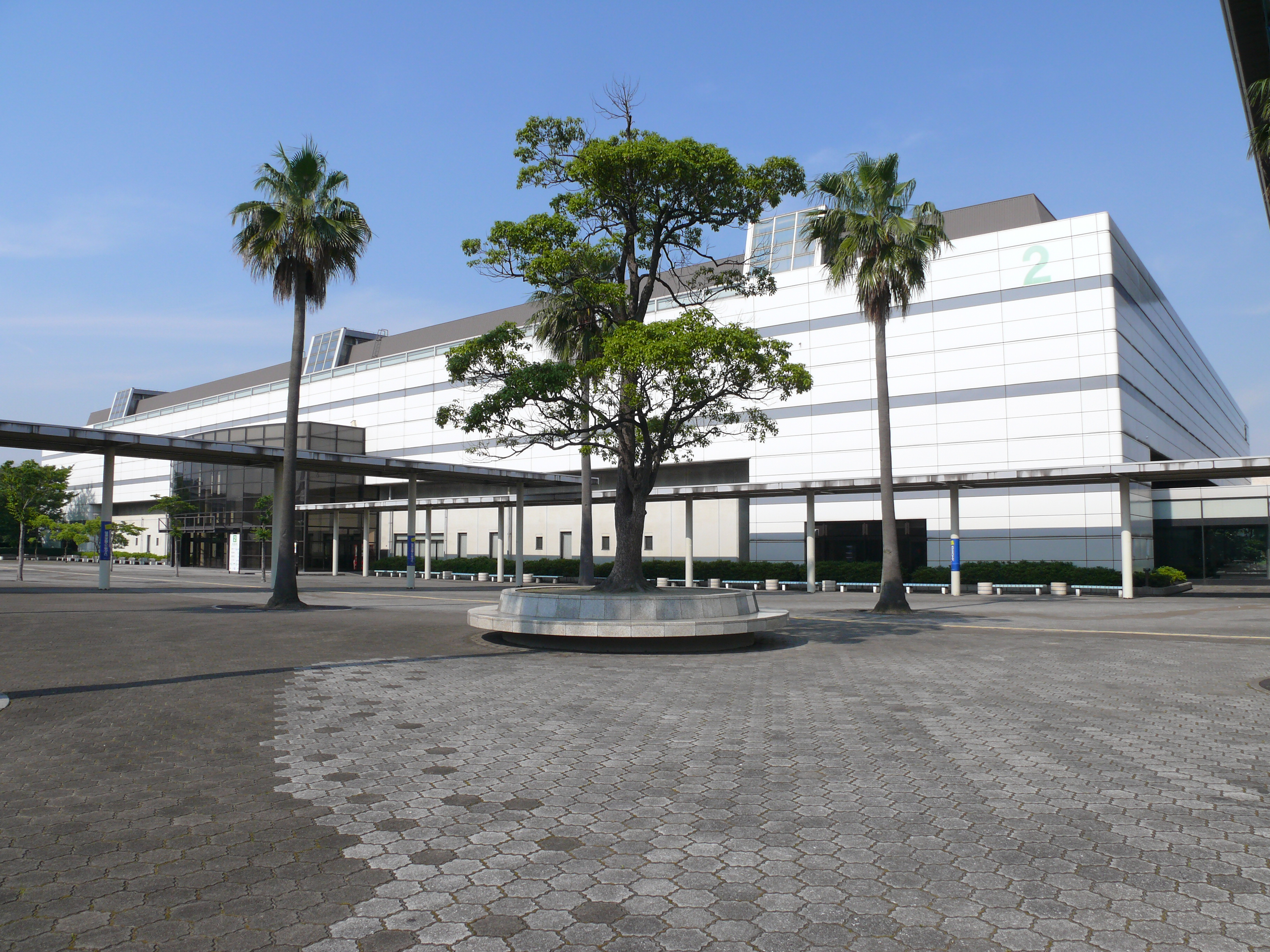
Real-life events were held at the indoor amusement park Namco Namja Town (pictured top in 2018) and the Nagoya International Exhibition Hall (bottom, 2008).

In the lead-up to its release, Ultra Despair Girls was advertised with television commercials. For the Japanese Vita release, Spike offered mousepads, digital wallpapers, and a Monokuma phone stand as pre-order incentives. Further physical merchandising was available at Comiket 2014 in August, including Kurokuma and Shirokuma plushies, a Monokuma fortune slip, pouch sets, tote bags, and armbands. Two original Vita background themes based on the game were sold separately after the release. For the 2015 PlayStation 4 port, NIS America released a limited edition bundled with an artbook, a 15-track soundtrack, a tie, a tie clip, a lapel pin, and an eyepatch.

To commemorate the game's release, Bandai Namco announced that their indoor amusement park Namco Namja Town would host a Danganronpa collaboration event between September 6, 2014, and October 3, called Danganronpa in Namja Town 2014. (Note: Danganronpa in Nanja Taun Nisen Jū Yon-nen (ダンガンロンパ in ナンジャタウン2014)) The event would feature Danganronpa-themed desserts, merchandise, and various games. Among attractions was Real Gakkyū Saiban in Namja Town (Kai), (Note: Riaru Gakkyū Saiban in Nanja Taun (リアル学級裁判 in ナンジャタウン (改); lit. 'Real Class Trial in Namja Town (Revised)')) a Werewolf-styled puzzle game brought back from a previous Danganronpa and Namja Town collaboration, in which participants debate to figure who amongst them ate Monokuma's salmon, in the style of the class trials from mainline Danganronpa games. From October, the game was rebranded to Zettai Zetsubō Kaigi, (Note: 絶対絶望会議 (lit. 'Ultra Despair Assembly')) with Ultra Despair Girls theming. In the second version, one participant is an ally of the Warriors of Hope whilst the others are members of the resistance. The resistance wins if they successfully repel three Monokuma attacks; the traitor's goal is to prevent them from doing so. Similar events—called Danganronpa in Namja Town Satelitte—were organized in Osaka, Shibuya, Fukuoka, and Nagoya, also for limited times.

To personally promote Ultra Despair Girls, Kodaka announced on his Twitter that he would host a "guerilla" signing event on launch day. He rotated game stores in Tokyo and signed copies of the game for any who could find him based on hints posted to Twitter. He opened in Akihabara, moved to Shinjuku, and ultimately finished at Namja Town in Ikebukuro. Kodaka signed copies of the game for around eighty people according to Famitsu editor Sekai Sandai Miyokawa, who accompanied Kodaka for about two hours since Shinjuku. Among these people were both Uchida—who found him in Akihabara after an hour of searching—and Ogata, who had a meeting closeby to one of the stores in Shinjuku. Spike Chunsoft's marketing team were not informed of the stunt until Kodaka's announcement post, but they let him go ahead regardless. Though they helped by contacting the stores which he would visit in advance, they otherwise "left him on his own" according to one manager.

Zettai Zetsubō Shūgaku Ryokō, (Note: 絶対絶望修学旅行 (lit. 'Ultra Despair School Trip')) an in-person event hosted by the developers of Ultra Despair Girls, was held at the Nagoya International Exhibition Hall on November 24, 2014. Tickets for the event were awarded via raffle to customers who made purchases of above 1,000 yen at any of three Danganronpa-themed shops located around Japan. It was attended by Terasawa, Sasaki, environment designer Satoshi Kawahara, and Takada from the development team, and Uchida, Ogata, and Kazusa Aranami (Kotoko Utsugi) from the voice cast.

== Reception ==
=== Critic reviews ===
Reception

Aggregate scores
Aggregator	Score
Metacritic	72/100 (Vita); 67/100 (PS4)
OpenCritic	48% recommend

Review scores
Publication	Score
4Players	7.5/10
Destructoid	6.5/10
Eurogamer	7/10
Famitsu	10/10, 8/10, 9/10, 8/10
Game Informer	5.5/10
GameRevolution	7/10
GameSpot	7/10
Hardcore Gamer	4/5
IGN	7.5/10
Jeuxvideo.com	12/20
Push Square	7/10
The Games Machine (Italy)	7/10
VentureBeat	85/100
Anime News Network	B−
Digitally Downloaded	4.5/5
Multiplayer.it	7/10
RPGSite	7/10, 9/10

According to review aggregator Metacritic, Danganronpa Another Episode: Ultra Despair Girls received "mixed or average" reviews from critics. (Note: Metacritic calculates reception based upon normalized scores from critics. Based upon 35 reviews on Vita and 13 on PlayStation 4, both versions of Ultra Despair Girls received "mixed or average" reviews.) Rival aggregator OpenCritic reported that 48% of 56 critics recommended the game.

Reviewers were divided on the third-person shooting gameplay, which some likened to Resident Evil. Robert Ramsey for Push Square considered it fun despite his expectations, whereas Joe Juba at Game Informer regarded the change in genre "baffling" and found that the execution ranged from merely functional to tedious. More positive reviewers thought that the presence of different bullet types made for interesting or challenging gameplay moments. Despite some input detection issues, Jens Bischoff at 4Players recalled chaining different bullets together in interesting ways and Famitsu's Kawachi enjoyed figuring out which weapon to use against the variations of enemies. Marco Inchingoli, a reviewer for the Italian The Games Machine, wrote that the multiple uses of the bullets managed to keep his attention through otherwise linear and repetitive shooting. Others found the strategic gameplay unrewarding: Juba blamed this on the design of enemies, who he said were "too stupid and predictable", and Elizabeth Henges at RPGSite experienced stress and frustration switching bullets during more hectic sections.

Reviewers disagreed on the quality of the puzzle rooms. Multiplayer.it's Davide Spotti found the challenges too easy and Dave Riley for Anime News Network thought they failed to compare to the "tortured, roundabout logic" of mainline Danganronpa titles. Contrarily, Juba and Digitally Downloaded's Matt Sainsbury thought the puzzles managed to promote unique usage of Truth Bullets in ways that the action sections did not. Writing in VentureBeat, Heather Newman described the puzzle rooms as "light" but nevertheless thought they added to the game's suspense and rewarded players for strategizing.

In contrast to the gameplay, some critics praised Ultra Despair Girls for maintaining the writing quality of its predecessors. Kōdai Kurimoto, in a review for Inside, thought the title succeeded as a Danganronpa entry, but failed from a gameplay perspective. Blake Peterson, writing in GameRevolution, found the focus on story to be the game's greatest flaw. He considered the shooting unengaging and poorly designed, and preferred if the game had been developed as a normal visual novel or walking simulator.

David Kreinberg at RPGSite and Destructoid's Laura Dale thought that Ultra Despair Girls' plot twists were amongst the strongest in Danganronpa, but that they occurred much slower. Other critics also held sentiments about the pacing: Julien Rateau for Jeuxvideo.com thought the dialogue dragged on for too long; similarly, Ramsey opined that the action and text segments interrupted each other's flow. Sainsbury and IGN Italy's Juan García found the opening slow, but thought the game eventually picked up its pace. Among positive reception of the writing, reviewers highlighted Toko Fukawa, partly for her dynamic relationship with Komaru and character development since Trigger Happy Havoc.

Critics considered Ultra Despair Girls the darkest game in the Danganronpa series to date. Particularly, several provided commentary on the traumas of the Warriors of Hope. Sainsbury considered the uncomfortable portrayal of these themes a necessity to the game establishing its premise: only by showing the worst adults can do to children would the player believe that a child would wish to massacre adults. Riley called the depiction of the Warriors of Hope's traumas "sickening and real": "I can't think of another game of this scope or budget that addresses it so directly, with such purpose, and with such focus on the victim". Rebecca Jones, writing for VG247, opined that Ultra Despair Girls generally did a good job portraying the aftermath of abuse rather than the events themselves, but that it occasionally "fumbles" this. During a boss fight with Kotoko Utsugi (a victim of sexual abuse), Komaru is tied up to a machine that will grope her unless the player succeeds at a minigame. In another boss fight, the player controls Komaru as she is stripped to her underwear. Sainsbury thought these scenes were parody on the exploitation of underaged characters in otaku culture, but that it sent too many "mixed messages" to serve a clear purpose.

Presentation-wise, several critics praised the game for its art style and character design; Ramsey considered it the most appealing Danganronpa game up until that point and Riley thought the "tacky pop" artstyle gave incentive to explore the map for secret collectibles. A few other reviewers had problems with the level environments, which Kalala found "boring" and Juba compared to large but unpopulated "shooting galleries". The music was praised by some as catchy, but other critics lamented the number of reused tracks.

=== Accolades and legacy ===
Ultra Despair Girls received a Jury Selection Award of the Entertainment category at the 19th Japan Media Arts Festival, an annual festival organized by the Agency for Cultural Affairs. In 2015, Gematsu's Sal Romano selected Ultra Despair Girls—as well as N++—as his overall Game of the Year. He thought the third-person gameplay was "wonky" at first but would grow on the player, and praised the story; particularly, he noted the relationship between Komaru and Toko. Writing for VG247 in 2024, Rebecca Jones described Ultra Despair Girls as an example of a console generation that was more "weird, messy, and experimental".

=== Sales ===
Upon release, Ultra Despair Girls sold 71,000 copies in Japan, which made it third best-selling game of the week behind The Legend of Heroes: Trails of Cold Steel and Super Smash Bros. for Nintendo 3DS. By October 2021, the game accounted for 10% (c. 500,000 units) of Danganronpa's total five million worldwide video game sales across all platforms.

== Other media ==
Ultra Despair Girls spawned various tie-ups. The game's official website featured an original browser game, Monokuma Factory, (Note: Monokuma Fakutorī (Japanese: モノクマファクトリー)) in which the player could tap the screen to produce a Monokuma and buy equipment to speed up the process. Players who created one hundred million Monokumas were awarded with original smartphone wallpapers and profile pictures for use on social media. A mobile app developed by Kingsoft Japan and S-Prism, Zettai Zetsubō Shōjo (Smartphone Saiteki-ka), (Note: Zettai Zetsubō Shōjo <Sumahō Saiteki-ka> (Japanese: 絶対絶望少女 <スマホ―最適化>; lit. 'Ultra Despair Girls (Smartphone Optimization)')) was released to Android phones on August 13, 2015. The application allowed users to customize their device with Ultra Despair Girls theming and manage cache, history, and files. An illustration of Komaru within the app's interface changed expression depending on the device's remaining storage. Outside of original media, Ultra Despair Girls characters have appeared in other IPs. From October 14, 2014, to October 23, Komaru, Toko, and others appeared as collaboration characters in Sega's Chain Chronicle, a tower defense role-playing game. Komaru and Makoto—together with the Hacking Gun—were added as DLC characters in Spike Chunsoft's RPG Mystery Chronicle: One Way Heroics through a September 2015 update.

Two volumes of comical short story anthologies by various illustrators based upon Ultra Despair Girls were published by Ichijinsha on January 24, 2015, and May 25, 2015, respectively. A titular manga adaptation of the game's story, illustrated by Hajime Tōya, was serialized in Kadokawa's online magazine Comic Clear for nineteen chapters between 2015 and 2017. An English translation by Jackie McClure was licensed in the West by Dark Horse Comics, who released the series' three volumes in one-year intervals from 2019 to 2021. In reviews for Anime UK News, Ian Wolf was critical of the wait times in between Dark Horse's volumes, but complimented the writing, art, and translation. A second manga by Kaoru Minamimachi, Genocider Mode, ran simultaneously as Tōya's adaptation and followed the game's story from the perspective of Toko. It began serialization in the seinen magazine Dengeki Maoh in January 2015 and ended in early 2016.

=== Anime episode ===
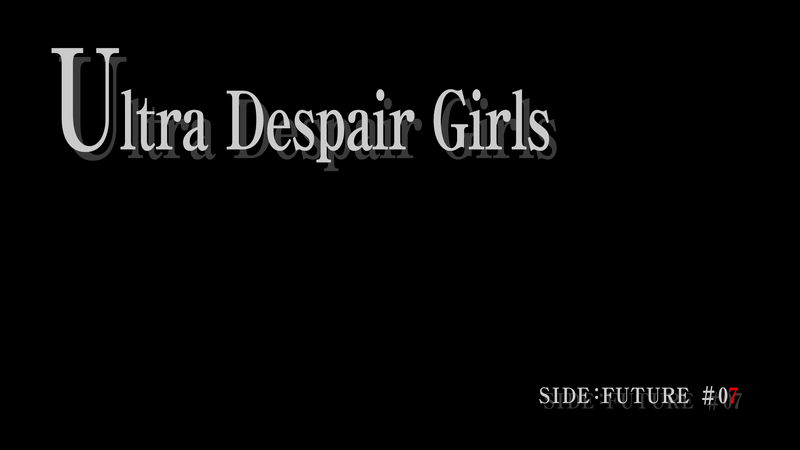
The title card for "Ultra Despair Girls" from Danganronpa 3: The End of Hope's Peak High School

A direct continuation to Ultra Despair Girls is told through the seventh episode of the Future Arc of Danganronpa 3: The End of Hope's Peak High School, an anime series that takes place after the events of Danganronpa 2. The episode, titled "Ultra Despair Girls", was originally premiered on August 22, 2016. The original Japanese voice cast—including Uchida as Komaru, Sawashiro as Toko, and Aya Hirano as Monaca Towa—reprised their roles for the episode. The English cast was selected by Funimation Entertainment, who recast Komaru to Alexis Tipton and Toko to Carli Mosier, although Cristina Vee returned as Monaca.

When agents of the Future Foundation are forced into a death game, Monaca is suspected as the mastermind. Since the events of the video game, she has been primed into Junko's successor thanks to Nagito. Komaru and Toko have allied with the other Warriors of Hope, who give Komaru the location to Monaca's new lair, a repurposed multi-floor building on the outskirts of Towa City. Komaru and Toko infiltrate the lair and prepare for a fight when they are cornered by Monokumas, but Monaca suddenly surrenders and detonates the building. Komaru and Toko survive the explosion and find Monaca lazing in a van. They interrogate her, but Monaca reveals that she has no correlation to the death game at Future Foundation; however, she cryptically warns that Makoto will soon cause someone's death. She announces that she is bored of life and her van blasts off into space, where she will live the rest of her life as a NEET. The episode ends with Komaru and Toko reporting back to Makoto and Byakuya, respectively.

Anime reviewers considered the episode a throwaway or filler part in the show. Jacob Chapman at Anime News Network, who rated the episode a B, was unimpressed with the story, but thought it was of less importance since Ultra Despair Girls was already an "awkward midquel" in the Danganronpa video games. He was more favorable to the episode's humor, which included callbacks to the game and cross-media references to other anime such as Code Geass, Adolescence of Utena, and Himouto! Umaru-chan. Tim Jones, writing for THEM Anime Reviews, considered "Ultra Despair Girls" a filler episode, but found it humorous how Monaca "more or less just says 'eh, I give up. Going to space now, okay bye'".

=== Possible sequel ===
Developers have indicated the possibility of a sequel to Ultra Despair Girls. In the third mainline Danganronpa game, Danganronpa V3: Killing Harmony (2017), the player can find a poster advertising Ultra Despair Girls 2. Kodaka said that the poster was not meant to hint that a sequel was planned or in development, but that he may one day crowdfund such a project. In a 2021 interview with Siliconera, Sasaki said that he would like for an Ultra Despair Girls sequel to be the series' next project. He conceived that it could follow the Naegis' mother and Hiroko Hagakure (a supporting character in Ultra Despair Girls) as they expose "the dark secrets of Towa City".

== Notes ==
Japanese titles and translations
