= Danganronpa Zero =

Japanese light novel

ダンガンロンパ/ゼロ
- Light novel
- Written by: Kazutaka Kodaka
- Illustrated by: Rui Komatsuzaki
- Published by: Seikaisha
- Original run: September 16, 2011 – October 14, 2011
- Volumes: 2

Danganronpa Zero (Note: Known in Japan as Danganronpa Zero (Japanese: ダンガンロンパ/ゼロ; lit. Danganronpa/Zero)) is a Japanese light novel written by Kazutaka Kodaka and illustrated by Rui Komatsuzaki. It was published by Seikaisha from September 16 to October 14, 2011, and has been collected in two tankōbon volumes. A prequel to Danganronpa: Trigger Happy Havoc, the novel focuses on Ryoko Otonashi, a student who, as a result of "The Tragedy", has anterograde amnesia (the inability to form new memories) and has short-term memory loss. Overseen by the school's Ultimate Neurologist and her childhood sweetheart Yasuke Matsuda, Ryoko becomes embroiled in a vast conspiracy within Hope's Peak Academy, involving the mysterious Izuru Kamukura and "Despair Sisters" Junko Enoshima and Mukuro Ikusaba, as "The Parade" protests arise outside.

The events of the novel set up several story elements that were later used in the video game Danganronpa 2: Goodbye Despair, in particular the character of Izuru Kamukura, while several characters introduced in the novel make cameo appearances in the anime Danganronpa 3: The End of Hope's Peak High School. Kodaka has cited Zero as the story in which he "finalized the larger world of Danganronpa, [which] led to the creation of the second game."

== Characters ==
=== Protagonists ===
Ryoko Otonashi (音無 涼子, Otonashi Ryōko) – The main protagonist, an amnesiac student known as the "Ultimate Analyst".

Yasuke Matsuda (松田 夜助, Matsuda Yasuke) – Ryoko's caretaker and childhood sweetheart, known as the "Ultimate Neurologist".

The Despair Sisters (絶望の姉妹, Zetsubō no Shimai) – Consisting of twin sisters Mukuro Ikusaba (戦刃 むくろ, Ikusaba Mukuro) and Junko Enoshima (江ノ島 盾子, Enoshima Junko), the pair are instigators of "The Tragedy".

Kyoko Kirigiri (霧切 響子, Kirigiri Kyōko) – A student known as the "Ultimate Detective", investigating Izuru Kamukura and the cause of "The Tragedy" after being hired by her estranged father.

=== Supporting characters ===
Isshiki Madarai (斑井 一式, Madarai Isshiki) – A group of octuplets and collective "Ultimate Bodyguard" who pursue Ryoko.

Yuto Kamishiro (神代 優兎, Kamishiro Yuto) – A perverted student and self-proclaimed "Ultimate Secret Agent" who assists Ryoko.

Soshun Murasame (村雨 早春, Murasame Sōshun) – An apparently comatose student in Matsuda's care and the only known survivor of "The Tragedy".

Jin Kirigiri (霧切 仁, Kirigiri Jin) – The Headmaster of Hope's Peak Academy, who tasks his estranged daughter Kyoko with investigating "The Tragedy" while he is dealing with "The Parade".

Izuru Kamukura (カムクラ イズル, Kamukura Izuru) – A student of indeterminate gender hiding on the grounds of the school, and the perpetrator of "The Tragedy".

The Steering Committee (評議委員) – The school board of Hope's Peak Academy and creators of Izuru Kamukura, who cover up their role in "The Tragedy".

== Development ==
After the making of the first Danganronpa game, there were no plans for a sequel. However, the team split up into different groups to make other projects. Initially reluctant, Kodaka was attracted by the idea of creating the novels Danganronpa Zero. After consulting to Terasawa, Kodaka decided to write the novel. While writing Zero, Terasawa approached Kodaka with the idea of a sequel in a few months. Kodaka was busy with the novel as he aimed to complete it so the sequel was written once he was finished with Zero. In the end, Kodaka wrote both Zero and Goodbye Despair at the same time. In retrospective, Kodaka considers the novels as needing more structuring work when comparing it with the game. He wrote elements he was doubtful from the first game into the novel as well as more hints towards Goodbye Despair. As a result, Kodaka recommends players to first read Zero before playing the sequel.

== Volumes ==
The novel has been collected into two tankōbon volumes, both of which were published in late 2011.

No.	Japanese release date	Japanese ISBN
1	September 16, 2011	978-4-06-1388123
2	October 14, 2011	978-4-06-1388154
