= Danganronpa 2: Goodbye Despair =

2012 visual novel

- Cover art featuring Monokuma (left), Monomi (right), and the students of Hope's Peak Academy
- Developer: Spike Chunsoft (Note: Known as Spike during development; additional work for Windows, OS X, and Linux by Abstraction Games)
- Publisher: Spike Chunsoft (Note: PlayStation 4 and PlayStation Vita versions originally published by NIS America outside of Japan)
- Director: Takayuki Sugawara
- Producer: Yoshinori Terasawa
- Designer: Shun Sasaki
- Programmer: Kengo Ito
- Artist: Rui Komatsuzaki
- Writers: Kazutaka Kodaka; Akira Kawasaki
- Composer: Masafumi Takada
- Series: Danganronpa
- Engine: Unity (Anniversary)
- Platforms: PlayStation Portable; PlayStation Vita; Microsoft Windows; OS X; Linux; PlayStation 4; Android; iOS; Nintendo Switch; Xbox One
- Release: July 26, 2012: PlayStation Portable; JP: July 26, 2012 PlayStation Vita; JP: October 10, 2013; NA: September 2, 2014; EU: September 5, 2014; AU: September 11, 2014 Linux, OS X; WW: April 18, 2016 Microsoft Windows; WW: April 18, 2016 Anniversary Edition; WW: May 10, 2022 PlayStation 4; Reload; NA: March 14, 2017; EU: March 17, 2017; JP: May 18, 2017 Trilogy; NA: March 26, 2019; EU: March 29, 2019 Android, iOS; WW: August 20, 2020 Nintendo Switch; JP: November 4, 2021; WW: December 3, 2021 Xbox One; WW: May 10, 2022
- Genres: Adventure, visual novel
- Mode: Single-player

Danganronpa 2: Goodbye Despair (Note: Known in Japan as Super Danganronpa 2: Sayonara Zetsubō Gakuen (Japanese: スーパーダンガンロンパ2 さよなら絶望学園, Hepburn: Sūpā Danganronpa Tsū: Sayonara Zetsubō Gakuen; lit. Super Danganronpa 2: Goodbye, Despair Academy)) is a 2012 visual novel developed by Spike Chunsoft. It is the second game in the Danganronpa franchise following Danganronpa: Trigger Happy Havoc (2010). It was first released in Japan for PlayStation Portable in July 2012, and a port for PlayStation Vita was released in Japan in October 2013. NIS America released the game worldwide in September 2014; a port for PC was released in April 2016 and a bundle for PlayStation 4 and PlayStation Vita called Danganronpa 1-2 Reload, also containing the first Danganronpa game, was released in March 2017. An enhanced version with the subtitle Anniversary Edition was released for Android and iOS in August 2020, for Nintendo Switch in November 2021, and for Microsoft Windows and Xbox One May 2022.

Development of the game started as Kazutaka Kodaka was writing the tie-in prequel light novel to Trigger Happy Havoc, Danganronpa Zero, and added hints about a sequel to the novel following their approval, revolving around the mysterious Izuru Kamukura. Kodaka aimed to develop a unique plot to give players more mysterious elements in a group of islands, inspired by the television series Lost. The protagonist Hajime Hinata is part of a group of high-school students who are trapped on a tropical island by their high school's headmaster Monokuma, a sentient stuffed bear, along with Monomi, a sentient stuffed rabbit. Similar to the first game, to leave the island, students must kill one of their peers and not be caught in the subsequent investigation and trial.

The game was well received based on sales and critics. Critical response to the game's narrative and cast was generally favorable. However, the gameplay elements involving class trials earned mixed responses; some writers found some parts of the game uninteresting, while early ones proved unchallenging. Danganronpa 2: Goodbye Despair was followed by the spin-off Danganronpa Another Episode: Ultra Despair Girls, which was released on September 25, 2014, and the anime Danganronpa 3: The End of Hope's Peak High School, which ran from July 11, 2016, to September 29, 2016. A loose sequel to the series, called Danganronpa V3: Killing Harmony, with similar gameplay but a different storyline was released on January 12, 2017. A "retelling" featuring a new story route, Danganronpa 2×2, was announced in a Nintendo Direct on September 12, 2025, and is scheduled for release on January 14, 2027.

== Gameplay ==
While focusing on class trials like the first Danganronpa, Goodbye Despair introduces the "Rebuttal Showdowns" where two students duel.

In a similar manner to the series' previous game, Danganronpa 2 has two modes of gameplay; School Life, which is split into Daily Life and Deadly Life sections, and the Class Trial. In the dating sim-like "Daily Life" section, players interact with other characters and progress through the plot. Conversing with characters during "Free Time" sections earns items known as Hope Fragments, which can be exchanged for skills that can be used in the Class Trial, increasing the protagonist's skill in debates. Players earn currency known as Monocoins by finding hidden Monokuma Figures and performing well in trials. Monocoins can be exchanged for presents that can be given to other characters during Free Time segments and thus create more Hope Fragments. In the Deadly Life section, which occurs when players discover a crime scene, the player must search for evidence that will help them in the upcoming Class Trial to expose the culprit.

The Class Trial, in which players must determine the identity of a culprit, has the same features as the previous game with new gameplay elements. Class Trials, which uses the first-person shooter genre, mostly consist of Nonstop Debates, in which players must find weaknesses in the students' discussions and shoot them with "Truth Bullets" that contradict them. Yellow "Argue Spots" and blue "Agree Spots" must be shot with a Truth Bullet, indicating someone is telling the truth. In the minigame Hangman's Gambit, players must combine matching letters appearing from both sides of the screen before they collide and combine incorrectly. Combined letters may either be destroyed or used to spell a clue. "Panic Talk Action" replaces "Bullet Time Battle", with a similar rhythmic timing gameplay mechanic used to overcome a student's mental defenses as the latter refuses to listen to logic. Controls from the last game are slightly revised; players must spell out a phrase in the correct order at the end of the section rather than firing a specific Truth Bullet. In the Closing Argument, players fill in a comic strip depicting the events of a crime; panels are selected from stocks, and must be chosen correctly, rather than being available from the start.

New gameplay elements have been added to the Class Trial. Rebuttal Showdowns take place when a student tries to refute the player's logic. In these sections, players must slash apart their opponents' argument to gain dominance in the conversation and reveal new information before using a "Truth Blade" to strike the correct weak point when it appears. Logic Dive is a snowboarding minigame in which players steer themselves down a logical tube while avoiding obstacles and pitfalls, and occasionally choosing between multiple routes based on a question to arrive at a logical conclusion. The final segment Spot Select requires players to examine an image and indicate an important spot.

Besides the Class Trials and Daily Event, Goodbye Despair also offers several mini-games. Players always have access to a virtual pet, accessed from the pause menu, that grows as players walk in the game and earns players rewards based on its Hope and Despair statistics. Magical Girl Miracle☆Monomi is a minigame in which players control Monomi, a mentor of the main characters, who fights waves of monsters. Island Mode, which is available after clearing the game once, is an alternative mode in which the students are not subjected to Monokuma's killing game and aim to make friends with each other and earn Hope Fragments, allowing players to bond with characters more easily than in the main story mode. Danganronpa IF, a short story depicting an alternative storyline for Danganronpa: Trigger Happy Havoc, is also unlocked after clearing the game once.

== Plot ==
In Goodbye Despair, players control the new protagonist Hajime Hinata, an amnesiac boy who has just become one of Hope's Peak Academy's "Ultimate" students alongside fifteen others, including the calm but mentally unstable lucky student Nagito Komaeda and the seemingly ordinary and quiet gamer Chiaki Nanami. The game is set on a remote tropical island called Jabberwock Island, where they have been marooned by their alleged teacher, a small, rabbit-like mascot named Usami, who claims it to be a field trip. However, the school's principal Monokuma hijacks the trip and usurps Usami's authority, reducing her to a powerless mascot named Monomi. He then announces the students cannot leave the island unless they participate in the Killing Game, a period in which students murder one or two of their classmates and attempt to get away with it. After the discovery of a body and an investigation is performed, the students deliberate the identity of the murderer in a Class Trial. If the students can identify a murderer in a Class Trial and vote accordingly, that culprit is executed, but if they make the wrong assumption the killer goes free whilst everyone else is sentenced to death.

Several students are murdered throughout the game, and, through Hajime's investigation, the killers are discovered and executed. The affluent progeny Byakuya Togami (later revealed to be the Ultimate Impostor) is inadvertently killed by chef Teruteru Hanamura in an attempt to stop Nagito from committing the first murder. Photographer Mahiru Koizumi is killed by swordswoman Peko Pekoyama, to prevent her master and friend, yakuza Fuyuhiko Kuzuryu, from killing her to avenge his sister's death. Musician Ibuki Mioda and traditional dancer Hiyoko Saionji are killed by nurse Mikan Tsumiki after she becomes infected with the Despair Disease, changing her meek nature into a malevolent one. Team manager Nekomaru Nidai is killed by animal breeder Gundham Tanaka in an honorable duel to prevent the rest of the students from starving to death. As these murders occur, new areas of the islands are discovered and the group becomes aware of an organization monitoring them, the "Future Foundation". Hajime also learns from a spiteful Nagito that he is not an Ultimate, but a member of Hope's Peak's Reserve Course, regular students who pay substantial fees to attend Hope's Peak. Nagito, through a convoluted process, arranges his own death so that Chiaki is considered his killer, and she willingly exposes herself to save the others from execution and is killed, alongside Monomi. During the graduation, it is learned that she is actually an AI program created by the late Chihiro Fujisaki to observe and protect the students during the Future Foundation's experiment. After Chiaki's death, Hajime recovers a memory of arriving at the islands with Nagito, who had replaced his arm and transplanted the arm of the late Junko Enoshima. As reality falls apart around him, Hajime learns that Nagito and his fellow students are surviving members of Ultimate Despair, a group Junko led, whose terrorist actions led to a crisis known as The Biggest, Most Awful, Most Tragic Event in Human History, also known as The Tragedy, which caused societal collapse worldwide.

The Future Foundation has been attempting to undo Ultimate Despair's damage. Makoto Naegi, the previous game's protagonist and survivor who now works for the Future Foundation along with his surviving classmates, captured the surviving members but, rather than executing them, decided to rehabilitate them by erasing their memories and putting them in a virtual reality program. During the Graduation Ceremony, Makoto enters the virtual reality before the survivors can choose to Graduate. He warns Hajime that an artificial intelligence copy of Junko has hijacked their program and is trying to manipulate events to possess the bodies of the deceased students, which are still intact in the real world, once the surviving students "graduate". Alter Ego Junko's ultimate plan is to download herself into every person on the planet. Makoto tells Hajime if the class votes not to graduate and instead hits the "Graduate" and "Repeat" buttons simultaneously, the system will shut down, reset, and purge Alter Ego Junko. Since there aren't enough students to activate the shutdown, Makoto's fellow survivors and friends from the previous game Kyoko Kirigiri and the real Byakuya Togami also enter to allow the shutdown to happen.

Alter Ego Junko attempts to deter Hajime by revealing he is Izuru Kamukura, the leader of Ultimate Despair who was experimented on by Hope's Peak Academy in order to create the "Ultimate Hope". The other students hesitate, afraid of reverting to their original personalities, but with the help and encouragement of Chiaki's essence, Hajime awakens to his true talent as the Ultimate Hope. Having the courage to create the future, he persuades the other surviving students, Fuyuhiko, princess Sonia Nevermind, mechanic Kazuichi Soda, and gymnast Akane Owari to refuse graduation, proposing that they create a future in which they do not have to live in despair. Hajime, Makoto, and the others reset the system, which revives Usami who uses her power to delete Alter Ego Junko. As the digital world shuts down, the survivors promise to retain their memories.

In the epilogue, Makoto and his friends awaken in the real world and depart the island on a ship. Makoto is confident the students will find a way to revive their friends and that they too can create their futures. Kyoko and Byakuya wish him luck in explaining these events to their superiors in the Future Foundation as the three leave the island. Hajime, having also returned to the real world with the others, watches them depart as he resolves to keep living his life as who he now is.

== Development and release ==
After the release of the first Danganronpa game, there were no plans for a sequel, and the game's development team was split up to work on other projects. As a result, writer Kazutaka Kodaka was attracted to the idea of creating the novel Danganronpa Zero, which he decided to write after consulting producer Terasawa. While writing Zero, Kodaka was approached by Terasawa with the idea of writing a sequel, and took on writing for both Zero and Goodbye Despair concurrently, eventually finishing with the former in October 2011. Kodaka considers the novels needed more structuring work than the game. As Zero foreshadows events of Goodbye Despair, Kodaka recommends gamers read Zero before playing the sequel. The writer attempted to create unique storytelling methods for Goodbye Despair; this is more relevant to the second half of the story, in which Hajime starts playing a video game when the player is already controlling Hajime. In retrospect, Kodaka felt proud of the way the game's writing focuses on humans and their emotions. Kodaka felt the second half of Goodbye Despair did a better job of making the characters real than Trigger Happy Havoc.

To bring more variety to the sequel, Monokuma was given a counterpart named Monomi (or Usami). Kodaka also said the islands were used to give players more content to explore, comparing the sequel to the television series Lost in terms of amount of plot twists and how different the narrative is. Kodaka said characters like Nagito and Byakuya were created to confuse returning players due to their similarities with characters from previous games. However, he still feels he made the cast more human as the story progresses. The characters were designed by Rui Komatsuzaki. In early sketches, Hajime's design differed from those used for the series; his hair was originally meant to be longer, and at one point, he was designed to be wearing glasses. He was the earliest designed character which generated a major contrast between his white clothing to Nagito's dark clothing.

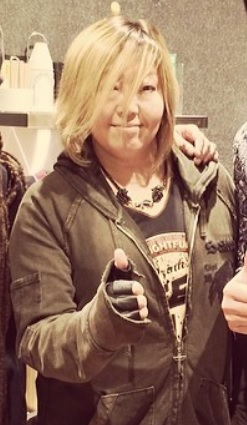
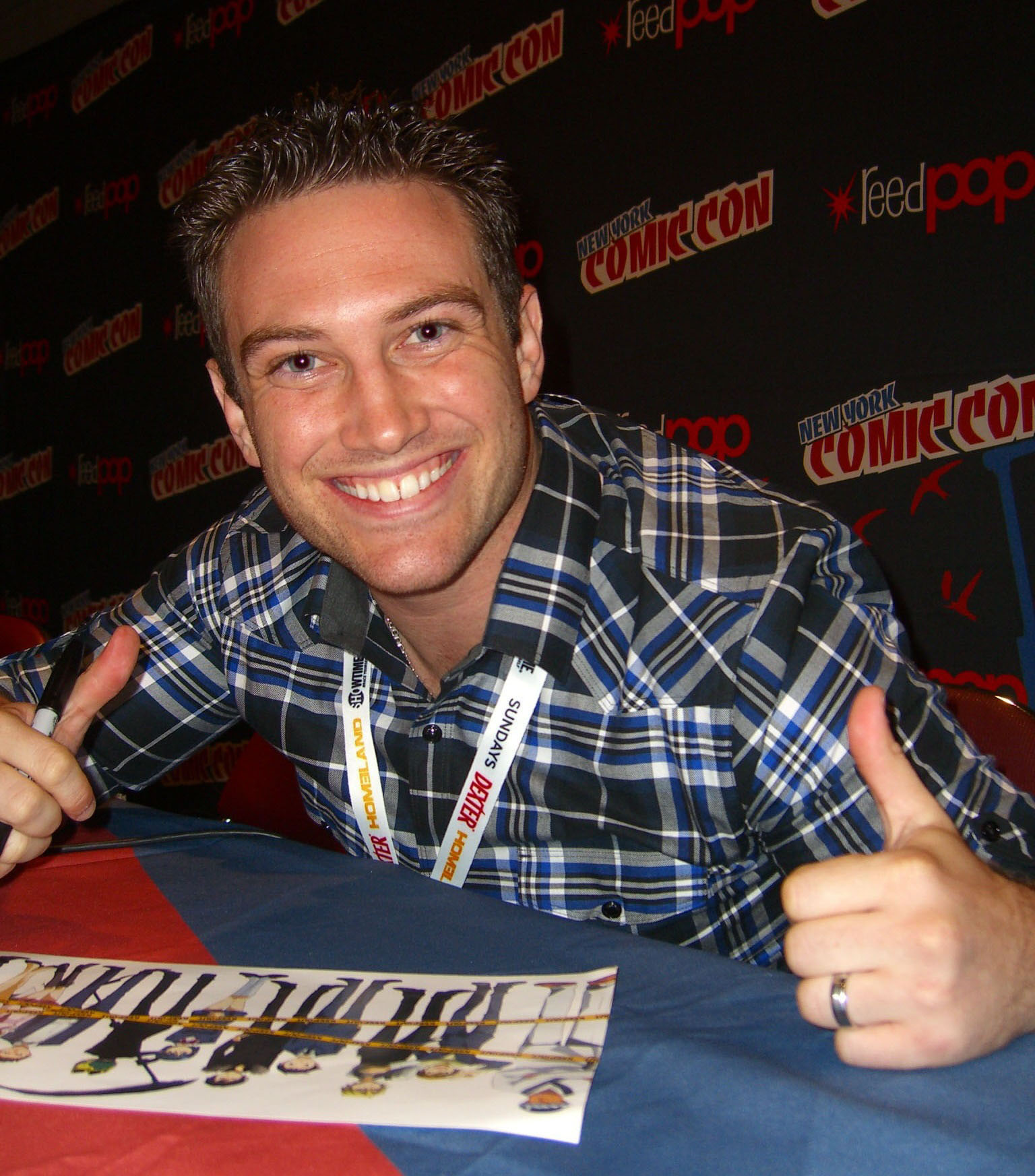
Both Megumi Ogata (left) and Bryce Papenbrook (right) voiced both Nagito Komaeda and Makoto Naegi in Japanese and English versions, respectively.

Nagito was made to be an absolute rival to Hajime, with a relationship similar to the one between the Joker and Batman in Batman (1989). Some traits of Nagito ended up making players believe the characters Makoto Naegi and Nagito Komaeda may be the same person, as Makoto and Nagito were both voiced by female actor Megumi Ogata. The name "Nagito Komaeda" was conceived as an anagram for "Naegi Makoto da" ("I am Makoto Naegi") to infer it is a pseudonym. Although the truth is that Nagito is a twisted version of Makoto Naegi, where instead of being a protagonist, he is an antagonist. Ogata had problems playing Nagito because she did not understand him. Komaeda was introduced with the same Lucky Talent as Makoto Naegi, but the staff considered them opposites based on their ideals of "hope". There was a lack of pre-release promotion materials for the original version of Goodbye Despair in its release year. This surprised Ogata because the anagram had been kept secret from the other developers and voice actors, including Ogata.

Other characters include the heroine Chiaki Nanami, with whom Hajime would often interact and bond romantically; Kodaka said the relationship between Makoto and Kyoko Kirigiri, a skilled detective and supporting character from the previous game, was meant to help the player solve cases. In the Japanese version of the game, Hajime was voiced by Minami Takayama, famous for voicing the main character of the detective manga Case Closed; the staff put a reference to her career in the snowboarding minigame of Goodbye Despair as Jimmy Kudo often surfs a turbo skateboard. Junko's resurrection was left to the player's interpretation. Kodaka compared her to comic book villains like the Joker and Magneto who always survive. Kodaka said Junko can be killed and that she may be the strongest villain he ever created.

Danganronpa 2 was first released for the PlayStation Portable in Japan on July 26, 2012. A limited edition that included a Monokuma PSP pouch, an art booklet, a soundtrack and audio commentary CD, keychains and badges, and a download code for a custom theme was available. A compilation of the game and its predecessor, Danganronpa: Trigger Happy Havoc, titled Danganronpa 1・2 Reload, with new touch controls and high resolution graphics, was released in Japan for the PlayStation Vita on October 10, 2013.

After releasing the Vita remake of the first game in North America and Europe in February 2014, NIS America released the sequel under the name Danganronpa 2: Goodbye Despair in Western territories in September 2014. Localization member Robert Schiotis said finding a voice actor for Nagito in the English-language version proved challenging because he is meant to clash with Makoto's ideals. Bryce Papenbrook voiced both characters, making the connections between them more interesting according to localization staff. Johnny Yong Bosch took the role of Hajime; Bosch found being immersed in Hinata's role difficult due to the lack of artwork depicting him. When a Danganronpa player asked him to sign a copy of Goodbye Despair, Bosch could better understand the character he voiced. As well as a standard edition, a limited edition was released via NIS America's online store, including an art book, soundtrack CD, stickers, Monokuma medals, and a pair of sunglasses. Danganronpa 1・2 Reload was also released in North America and Europe for PlayStation 4 in March 2017. An enhanced version for Android and iOS, under the name Danganronpa 2: Goodbye Despair Anniversary Edition, was released on August 20, 2020. This version features the gallery mode, allowing players to replay the character voices and view event illustrations. During E3 2021, it was announced that this version of the game will also be released for the Nintendo Switch in 2021, both as part of the Danganronpa Decadence bundle, as well as separately. It was also released for Xbox One and Windows via Microsoft Store on May 10, 2022. It was made available through Xbox Game Pass on the same day.

== Reception ==
=== Critical response ===
Reception

Aggregate score
Aggregator	Score
Metacritic	VITA: 81/100; PC: 83/100

Review scores
Publication	Score
Destructoid	8/10
Famitsu	9/10, 10/10, 9/10, 9/10
Game Informer	8/10
GameRevolution	4/5
GameSpot	8/10
Giant Bomb	3/5
Joystiq	3.5/5
Polygon	8/10
TouchArcade	4/5
VideoGamer.com	8/10

Awards
Publication	Award
Famitsu	Game of the Year (Readers)
Hardcore Gamer	Best PS Vita Game, Best New Character (Monokuma); Best Adventure Game
Japan Game Awards	Award of Excellence

Danganronpa 2: Goodbye Despair received "generally favorable" reviews based on Metacritic reviews. Upon its release in North America, the game was met with praise for its plot. VideoGamer said "Danganronpa 2 tells a great story that is worthy of your time" while GameSpot was "hooked from the get-go, enthralled by every surprise turn taken by the story, stunned by every unexpected character revelation, devastated at every death, and pumping my fist at every small victory against that bastard Monokuma". Polygon's reviewer found the cast's traits repetitive but enjoyed the dating sim elements. He found the trials more challenging and engaging than those of the original game, including the searches for clues when interacting with the cast. He said newcomers to the franchise would be confused by the story of Goodbye Despair, which is connected with the plot of the first game. On the other hand, Game Revolution stated the mystery involving the connection between two Danganronpa games is obvious and it does not confuse newcomers, who would notice clues. The reviewer also said the humor is more adult and perverted than that of the first game, making it feel more innovative for its genre.

The class trials earned mixed responses. Giant Bomb praised the way the class trials become progressively more challenging. According to Hardcore Gamer, "So much of Dangranonpa 2 is an immediate, purposeful retread in both mechanics and storytelling" he felt there were not many improvements. Hardcore Gamer appreciated the new setting and enjoyed the multiple plot twists for being more difficult to understand than those of the previous game, and added references to other games made him feel the plot is self-aware. Touch Arcade praised the touch controls of the cellphone versions and said the camera control in particular is vastly better than in any previous version of the game. While criticizing the lack of cloud saving and the need to keep the notch on the right, they also considered the cellphone versions superior to previous versions in terms of performance, content, and interface. GameSpot enjoyed the class trials for staying true to the original formula but gave a negative response to the minigames, which the reviewer said feel unnecessary. GameSpot also praised the plot and cast. GameRevolution said the additions to the original class trial system are enjoyable because they provide more variety in terms of gameplay but found some mechanics annoying. Due to the multiple minigames of the class trials, Game Revolution wished the game had focused more on its visual novel style, which he felt is the part of the game that stood out the most. Hardcore Gamer enjoyed the blade-based style in the form of the Rebuttals and the revised Hangman's Gambit, which come across as improvements. According to Video Gamer, the gameplay mechanics are one of the title's weak points.

The characters and their interactions with Hajime were the subject of praise. Video Gamer praised the returning villain Monokuma and said the cast provide enjoyment despite having mixed thoughts about their originality due to most being stereotypes previously seen in other games. Joystiq praised the balance between lighthearted moments and violent deaths, and said the characters are likable and distinct enough from each other enough to make their dating sim events enjoyable and easy. Touch Arcade liked the characters and their dating sim elements, favoriting Ibuki Mioda and Nagito Komaeda. While originally viewing the cast as archetypes, GameInformer noted the writing was good at fleshing them out. Hardcore Gamer had mixed feelings in regards to the cast, viewing some as likable and others as annoying despite the more engaging narrative. Similarly, Polygon found few character bondings in the game worthwhile due to some being less likable than the original Danganronpa and the rest dying across the title.

Danganronpa 2: Goodbye Despair won an "Award of Excellence" at the Japan Game Awards 2013 ceremony. Hardcore Gamer awarded it "Best PS Vita Game", "Best New Character" (Monokuma) and "Best Adventure Game". Famitsu readers voted it the best game of 2012.

=== Sales ===
The game sold 69,000 copies during its first week on sale in Japan and was the fifth best-selling game of the week. In Japan, the PSP version sold 162,408 copies during its life cycle. The Steam release had an estimated 178,000 players by July 2018. By October 2021, Spike Chunsoft confirmed that the game had achieved over 1 million sales on PC alone.

== Other media and appearances ==
Several manga publications based on Danganronpa 2: Goodbye Despair have been conceived. A direct adaptation began serialization in Enterbrain's Famitsu Comic Clear magazine from December 10, 2012. The spin-off manga Dangan Island - Kokoro Tokonatsu Kokoronpa♪, Chō-Kōkō-Kyū no Kōun to Kibō to Zetsubō, and Nanami Chiaki no Sayonara Zetsubō Daibōken were published by Mag Garden from October 2013. Another spin-off, Nangoku Zetsubo Carnival!, was serialized in GA Bunko's magazine from April 2013. Other two include 4Koma Kings and Comic Anthology compilations by various artists. Dark Horse Comics has released the Chō-Kōkō-Kyū no Kōun to Kibō to Zetsubō manga under the title Danganronpa 2: Ultimate Luck and Hope and Despair in North America on September 15, 2018. They also published the first of three volumes of the Super Danganronpa 2: Sayonara Zetsubou Gakuen manga, as Danganronpa 2: Goodbye Despair in North America, on March 25, 2020.

Monomi appears at the end of the final episode of the first game's 2013 anime television adaptation Danganronpa: The Animation. An anime adaptation of Danganronpa 2: Goodbye Despair was initially planned but the producers instead chose to make an original anime series titled Danganronpa 3: The End of Hope's Peak High School, which aired between July and September 2016. The series' second part Despair Arc focuses on the characters of Goodbye Despair prior to the events of the first game. An original video animation titled Super Danganronpa 2.5: Komaeda Nagito to Sekai no Hakaisha (スーパーダンガンロンパ2.5 狛枝凪斗と世界の破壊者; lit. Super Danganronpa 2.5: Nagito Komaeda and the Destroyer of Worlds), which takes place between the events of Danganronpa 2 and Danganronpa 3's Future Arc, was bundled with Danganronpa V3: Killing Harmony in Japan on January 12, 2017.

A Monomi costume is available in the Japanese PS Vita and PlayStation 3 versions of Terraria. Downloadable outfits based on Monokuma and Monomi also appear in the Super Sonico game Motto! SoniComi.

=== Danganronpa 2×2 ===
A "retelling", Danganronpa 2×2 (pronounced 'two by two'), was announced in the September 2025 Nintendo Direct presentation. It will feature an entirely new story written by Yoichiro Koizumi and supervised by Kodaka. As well as this, it features an enhanced version of the original game's story. Developed by Gemdrops in collaboration with Too Kyo Games and Spike Chunsoft, Danganronpa 2×2 is scheduled for release on January 14, 2027, for Nintendo Switch, Nintendo Switch 2, PlayStation 5, Windows, and Xbox Series X/S. According to Kodaka, the game is not a "remake", but rather, a "retelling" featuring the same characters and setting.
