= Recorded by Arizal =

Animated series

- Genre: Science-fiction
- Created by: Yssa Badiola
- Written by: Yssa Badiola; Joshua Kazemi
- Directed by: Yssa Badiola
- Creative director: Jordan Cwierz
- Voices of: Christine Marie Cabanos; Christine Stuckart; Monica Rial; César Altagracia
- Country of origin: United States
- Original language: English
- No. of seasons: 1
- No. of episodes: 4

Production
- Executive producers: Matt Hullum; Luis Medina; Geoff Ramsey
- Producers: Minni Clark; Austin Harper
- Running time: 3–5 minutes
- Production company: Rooster Teeth Animation

Original release
- Network: Rooster Teeth
- Release: July 13 – August 3, 2020

Recorded by Arizal is an American animated web series created by Yssa Badiola. The first episode was released on July 13, 2020. The series premiered Rooster Teeth's website for members, moving to other platforms and becoming free-to-watch a week later. Badiola stated that the show is for young adults coming of age and incorporates her own life experience. The series was intended as a four-part prelude to a full series.

== Premise ==
The series follows the story of Arizal, a 16-year-old Pinoy girl and straight A student who is about to pursue her desired career, to become a Record Keeper. The question remains if she can leave Maktaba, a cloistered city-state, and create records in the wide world. Through a set of vlogs, she ponders whether she can undertake this task, as part of this entry of self-discovery, and head into the world, explaining life beyond the city's limits to those living within the city. Arizal serves as the protagonist and the "audience's lens into this world".

== Characters ==
- Arizal (voiced by Christine Marie Cabanos), the story's overachieving protagonist, a 16-year-old high school student putting together a series of vlogs about why she wants to be a record keeper, wanting to go on an adventure. Her name is pronounced "AW-rih-sawl."
- Lia (voiced by Christine Stuckart), as one of Arizal's childhood friends who convinced her to become a record keeper, and wants Arizal to experience the world rather than be holed up in her room.
- Rizella, one of Arizal's childhood friends who convinced her to become a record keeper. Something happens to her which scares Tita, as indicated in "Log iv."
- Tita Cherry (voiced by Monica Rial), who is Arizal's aunt, who she is living with during the summer. Tita runs a tight ship in the house, chastising Arizal for not cleaning her room in the show's first episode.
- Dante (voiced by César Altagracia), an experienced record keeper, introduced in the second episode.

== Episodes ==
No.	Title	Directed by	Written by	Length	Original release date
1	"Log i"	Yssa Badiola	Yssa Badiola	3:40	July 13, 2020
In the middle of summer vacation, Arizal, a 16-year-old senior from Yamayan, begins her extra credit assignment: creating a video diary as to why she wants to be a record keeper. The latter are citizens of Maktaba who explore the world and record their progress while adding to the "global archive." She introduces her two childhood friends, Rizella and Lia, saying they convinced her to pursue this path, and notes how she lives with her aunt, uncle, and cousin. At the end of the episode, she struggles to answer why she wants to be a record keeper, saying she will get back to the question later.
2	"Log ii"	Yssa Badiola	Joshua Kazemi	3:47	July 20, 2020
Arizal prepares herself to talk to Dante, an experienced "big boy" record keeper, even having a set of questions to ask him. However, what she hears from him shakes her rosy picture of a record keeper that she has painted in her mind. As he talks to her about issues like the importance of toilet paper, Arizal is confronted with some of the harsh realities of becoming a record keeper. After a sandstorm cuts their conversation short, Arizal unsure of how to proceed in fulfilling her dream to be a record keeper.
3	"Log iii"	Yssa Badiola	Joshua Kazemi	4:03	July 27, 2020
After processing what Dante told her, Arizal breaks down, lamenting that she will be a record keeper alone, without her friends or her treasured books. In her despair, she questions if she should fulfill her dream, thinks that Dante called her pathetic to her face, and remembers that her mother traveled the world. Later on, she proves her knowledge when messaging her friend Rizella, who calls her an "adorable bookworm," which lifts her spirits. Toward the end of the episode, Lia stops by, points out that she has been holed up in her room the whole summer, and attempts to get her to come to a club to dance. Arizal compromises and agrees to dance with her friend in front of her house.
4	"Log iv"	Yssa Badiola	Yssa Badiola	4:53	August 3, 2020
Arizal reflects on what Dante told her and her mission as a record keeper, walking up a pitch-black staircase and onto a mountain overlook, which is outside the city and District 4 – the first time she has been outside the city and the district. She notes that her journey to the lookout is the same test given to record keepers, a test which the record keepers don't reveal. Arizal says that she should still try to be a record keeper, how Rizella is a dear friend to her, and gives reasons to be a record keeper: discover something out in the world, go to the places her mother has been to, or travel as a keeper with her friends. After noting how her friends complete her, she gets an urgent call from her Tita, telling her to return home since something happened to Rizella. The end of the episode shows her application to become a record keeper being accepted.

== Production ==
=== Development ===
Director Yssa Badiola first envisioned the show in 2017. She hoped that the prelude helped audiences embrace and story. Arizal's name is derived from Filipino nationalist José Rizal. Badiola's own Filipino heritage shaped the show. She noted that Josh Kazemi and Jordan Cwierz were helpful in development of the show. Badiola pitched the show to Rooster Teeth executives and developed a full animatic of the show so she could convince them to support the show. According to Badiola, there were a "lot" of LGBTQ characters in a "show proper" originally pitched and the series was set thousans of years in the future on Earth.

Badiola's idea coincided with Joshua Kazemi pitching a live-action series about "a female vlogger in a remote setting" in January 2018, and Rooster Teeth encouraged him to come together with Badiola, with both beginning to work together on the show after that. Others who worked on the show include: Tess Richards, who worked on color, light, and detail of the backgrounds; Lauren Crozier, who designed the background; Al McClelland, Jr., who worked on the storyboards; supervising producer Maggie Tominey; producer Minni Clark; sound designer Alena Lecorchick; and re-recording mixer Philip Spann.

=== Release ===
The show was originally promoted in a six-second clip by Rooster Teeth on January 15, 2020, under the name "Record Keeper". The name was later changed as it was owned by another company. Rooster Teeth shared the first promo for the show on June 23. The same day, Badiola shared character designs of Arizal created for the show, and confirmed that Arizal is a Filipina.

Rooster Teeth shared the second promo for the show on June 29. Badiola hosted a Comic-Con@Home panel for the show in July.

In July 2020, Badiola confirmed that Recorded by Arizal was a four-part prelude to a longer show, as suggested by fellow Rooster Teeth writer and director Joe Nicolosi. Badiola felt that the prelude is a "great way" to do world-building. The lowercase Roman numerals in the episode titles intended to demonstrate that it is an introduction to the show. In July 2020, Badiola noted that she suffered several panic attacks during the show's production and expressed her concerns about the show's future. Kazemi wrote that the show became "more relatable" during the COVID-19 pandemic because more people are living in a world where "streaming from home, talking into webcams, and staying in their rooms".

On September 21, 2020, Badiola hosted a RTX panel with Christine Marie Cabanos, Joshua Kazemi, and Kdin Jenzen, the latter who was moderating. In the panel, in September 2020, Kazemi described how Arizal values "physical things," said it was a "blast" to write the text messages between Arizal and her friends, and how the relationship Arizal had with the camera changed over the episodes.

=== Themes and influences ===
Badiola was influenced by shows like Fleabag, The Lizzie Bennet Diaries and other series by Pemberley Digital shows, along with animated vlogger Any Malu. In September 2020, Badiola talked about the design of Arizal's room and said that she took inspiration from Atsuko "Akko" Kagar, the protagonist of Little Witch Academia, Izuku Midoriya / Deku, the protagonist of My Hero Academia in the design of Arizal, with her outfit based on school uniforms in the Philippines. She also stated the series had a lot of herself integrated into the story and "some observations and things I felt growing up," but is not a fictionalized version of herself.

Badiola said that the prelude is mainly a coming of age story, but the main driving theme is "the discussion of record keeping and learning," hoping that she can get the chance in the future to show that. Badiola stated that she sometimes felt that the show is for her, and incorporates the struggles of being an Asian-American, with the idea you have "one foot in your home country and the other the country you only ever knew about" as a person's body straddles the line of "torn, inadequate, and desiring to engage, all at once".

In June 2020, Christine Marie Cabanos, who voices Arizal, noted her enjoyment of portraying a Filipina lead character. In September 2020, Cabanos added the emotional range she used in her voice overs, stated that Arizal's voice is close to her own, making her easy to voice the character, and explained how fun it was to voice Arizal as compared to those she voiced in the past. She pointed out how much the show means to the Asians and Filipino community.

== Reception ==
Tommy Williams of GeekTyrant praised the series, calling it interesting but shorter than expected, noting that the first episode gave a small glimpse into the character of Arizal's Tita, Cherry, and her best friend, Lia. He described the animation as "decent" and said he would be likely to watch the other episodes to see where the show goes, though worried that interest for the show would "die down in the interim" between episode releases. Burkely Hermann, of the National Security Archive, noted on the American Archivist Reviews Portal that although the show does not feature archives as physical spaces or institutions, it had archival themes that could be expanded in a future "proper season." His review also noted how recordkeepers in the show have similar roles as those of real-world archivists, expressed hope that Arizal's quests will make the "annals of history richer for all the people of Maktaba," and stated that, in the future, Arizal may be responsible for records of enduring value. This would mean, in his assessment, that Arizal would be in good company with fellow learned scholars at the athenaeum.

== Future ==
In September 2020, Badiola and Cabanos expressed excitement at "plans" for Arizal to travel outside her bedroom and into the wider world as a recordkeeper. Badiola added that there would be many "elements of storytime" with narration if there was a full season, including exploring Arizal's sexuality (and gender).

On January 29, 2021, Badiola, when asked by a fan, said that there was "no news on a full season".

Following the closure of Rooster Teeth in mid-May 2024, rights for the series were purchased by Burnie Burns and company, his Box Canyon Productions LLC, along with some of the other properties. On November 11, 2025, on his Morning Somewhere Podcast, Burns stated that the series was leaving the site, in a move that had been planned "for a long time," saying Warner had "wildly overvalued" the series, and had returned the rights for the series back to Badiola. The co-host, Ashley Jenkins, said there would be a post where viewers could find it in the future. On November 16, 2025, Burns wrote that Badiola was "busy finding a new home" for the series. Prior to this, Badiola had stated, in March 2025, that she was "still figuring out" the rights to the series.

On September 30, 2025, Badiola said that although it would take a while for her to begin working on the series again, she was happy she could do so at a time she chose, adding that when Arizal returns, "she'll be as changed as I am."
