= Junko Enoshima =

- Danganronpa character
- Junko behind Monokuma, as depicted in Danganronpa: Trigger Happy Havoc.
- First game: Danganronpa: Trigger Happy Havoc (2010)
- Created by: Kazutaka Kodaka
- Designed by: Rui Komatsuzaki
- Voiced by: English: As Monokuma: Brian Beacock (video games); Greg Ayres (anime); As Junko: Amanda Céline Miller (video games); Erin Fitzgerald (video games); Jamie Marchi (anime); Japanese: As Monokuma: Nobuyo Ōyama; TARAKO (musical); As Junko: Megumi Toyoguchi
- Portrayed by: Sayaka Kanda (musical)

Junko Enoshima (Japanese: 江ノ島 盾子, Hepburn: Enoshima Junko) is a fictional character and the overarching antagonist of Spike Chunsoft's Danganronpa series. She is introduced as the mastermind behind the first two games and the true persona of the series mascot Monokuma. In the spin-off game Danganronpa Another Episode: Ultra Despair Girls, she appears via the avatars of Shirokuma and Kurokuma. Junko(June-koh) also serves as the protagonist of the prequel light novel Danganronpa Zero under the identity of the Ultimate Analyst, Ryōko Otonashi (Japanese: 音無 涼子, Hepburn: Otonashi Ryōko) and further appears in the anime Danganronpa 3: The End of Hope's Peak High School: Despair Arc.

A student of Hope's Peak Academy, Junko is the Ultimate Fashionista, a charismatic and hyper-intelligent gyaru fashion model. Alongside her fraternal twin sister and body double Mukuro Ikusaba, she forms the Ultimate Despair, and orchestrates the end of civilization through a movement known as "The Tragedy". In Danganronpa: Trigger Happy Havoc, Junko arranges a killing game between her former classmates to test their metrics for hope and despair, participating alongside Mukuro as "hidden" contestants. Following her death, Junko's consciousness is preserved into an artificial intelligence known as Alter Ego Junko. This AI serves as a central antagonist in Danganronpa 2: Goodbye Despair and Danganronpa Another Episode: Ultra Despair Girls, where she works with Izuru Kamukura to ensure the continuation of her plans.

The identity of Junko is frequently adopted by other characters throughout the franchise. Mukuro Ikusaba poses as her sister in Danganronpa: Trigger Happy Havoc and Danganronpa Zero, while an intended successor seeks to claim her mantle in Danganronpa Another Episode: Ultra Despair Girls. Additionally, the showrunners of the Danganronpa reality television series utilize her likeness in Danganronpa V3: Killing Harmony. The character has also appeared in various manga and musical adaptations of the series.

== Conception and creation ==
Early unused artwork of Junko Enoshima by Rui Komatsuzaki.

Junko was conceived by series' creator and scenario writer Kazutaka Kodaka originally as a "fully unsympathetic" villain, due to his at the time personal dislike for the popular trope of being a sympathetic villain. Kodaka later elaborated that Junko appears to have toxic love towards her classmates due to how rather than killing them, she forces them to kill each other as she believes that despair is the ultimate salvation for people.

"I wanted to create a character who is bad because she is evil, who only desires outright desperation. With no possibility of redemption ... Another thing I wanted to do was create a really cute character who was evil. Also that she had the idea that absolute evil is something desirable and pleasant. As bad as she is, she is so powerful and charming that she draws you in. So one way I thought of showing that was to make a very cute character that was visually appealing to look at." — Kazutaka Kodaka

Kodaka later confirmed Junko's motives to be rooted in her obsession for the entirety of her classmates, seeking to induce more despair on someone and herself the more they meant to them, along with subtle hints of her past and sanity slippage. Early concept art for the character depicts her with smaller pigtails, a white skirt, and an overall golden color scheme with red and black highlights, elements of which were also adopted for the character's fraternal twin sister Mukuro Ikusaba. The character's resurrection in Goodbye Despair was left to the player's interpretation. Kodaka compared the theory of whether or not she is dead or alive to Western villains like the Joker who are continuously brought back to life. However, Kodaka claims Junko can be killed. In retrospective, he feels like Junko could be his strongest villain ever created. Due to how powerless Junko is in comparison to Izuru, the scenes involving how the former manipulates the latter were written to show Junko at her lowest since she could not defeat Izuru in combat, so the writers focused on psychology involving their passions.

== Appearances ==
=== Danganronpa video games ===
In the first game, Danganronpa: Trigger Happy Havoc, Junko fakes her death by having Mukuro pose as her so she can kill her under her Monokuma guise, using the event to encourage her former classmates at Hope's Peak Academy to participate in a "killing game", both actions serving to feed her desire to fuel an "ultimate despair" within herself and them. Throughout the game, Junko (in the form of a robotic teddy bear dubbed Monokuma) provides various motives to turn the students against one another, overseeing the subsequent class trials and performing the various executions while broadcasting the events to the world at large, culminating in her presenting Mukuro's corpse in an attempt to frame the "Ultimate Detective" Kyoko Kirigiri without breaking the rules she set for herself for the "killing game", and ultimately agreeing to execute herself after being exposed as the mastermind.

In Danganronpa 2: Goodbye Despair, Junko is revealed to have used Chihiro's Alter Ego technology to transfer her consciousness into Monokuma at the moment of her death as an A.I. (explaining their reactivation in the prior game's post-credits scene), hijacking the Future Foundation's attempted removal of her followers' brainwashing by having the former "Ultimate Hope" Izuru Kamukura download her into their rehabilitation program "Neo World", where she places their younger virtual selves into another "killing game". In the game's climax, Junko's true plan is assumed to be to transfer her A.I self into the bodies of those of her followers whose virtual selves killed each other, their real selves having arranged their capture to allow Junko a chance to return in a physical body, and from there to the watching Future Foundation and the wider world at large, to be dubbed "Junkoland". Ultimately, after her still-living followers' virtual selves decide to remain in the program, Alter Ego Junko is deleted by a new manifestation of the program's former operator, Usami.

In the climax of Danganronpa Another Episode: Ultra Despair Girls, set between the first and second games, the Monokuma variants Shirokuma and Kurokuma are both revealed to be under the control of Alter Ego Junko, before they are both destroyed by Izuru Kamukura so he can bring it with him to Jabberwock Island, setting up the events of Danganronpa 2: Goodbye Despair.

Junko appears in a cameo appearance in the third main series installment, Danganronpa V3: Killing Harmony, in the bonus minigame "Ultimate Talent Development Plan", with the game's main storyline, set in a world where-in a Dangaonronpa reality television show based on the fictional Danganronpa franchise has been hosted yearly for 53 years within an otherwise violence-free futuristic utopia, seeing the mantle of Junko be assumed by the series' showrunner each season.

=== Danganronpa anime ===
In the "Despair Arc" of Danganronpa 3: The End of Hope's Peak High School, set before the events of the first game, Junko is collected from the airport along with Mukuro to a limousine after she blows up her taxi. Junko explains that the pair have been scouted to attend Hope's Peak Academy, Mukuro as the "Ultimate Soldier", and Junko as both the "Ultimate Fashionista". At their entrance ceremony, Junko sketches a picture of Monokuma. Two years later, Junko and Mukuro slaughter their way to confront and destroy Hope's Peak Academy's "Ultimate Hope" Izuru Kamukura, intending to kill him, only for the pair to be easily defeated. After sharing Junkos love for despair with him and pitching that they join their cause, Izuru deduces Junko shares similar analytical abilities to himself, agreeing to join their cause, before knocking Junko out. Later, Junko manipulates the "Ultimate Animator" Ryota Mitarai, to develop a brainwashing anime to serve her cause, which she tests on the "Ultimate Nurse" Mikan Tsumiki, who pledges herself to Junko in the name of despair. Contacting Izuru once again, Junko arranges for their first "killing game" with the academy's student council, trapping them on a floor of the school and providing blackmail on their elite parents' various scandals, with Izuru partaking in the event and killing the final survivor. Junko subsequently uses Izuru's involvement in a recording which she sends along with a mass e-mail to the students of the Reserve Course exposing his existence along with the footage of her killing game and how their funding had been used for human experimentation which led to Izuru's creation, leading to a mass riot and protest dubbed "The Parade".

Before said e-mail was sent out Junko created a new brainwashing video dubbed the "Despair Video" with the intent of sharing it with the entirety of the Reserve Course and pull in further support for "Ultimate Despair", afterwards, Nagito Komaeda and Chiaki Nanami, looking for their missing classmate Mikan Tsumiki. However, after their homeroom teacher Chisa Yukizome comes across the group and creates a diversion, the pair escape, leaving Chisa to be brainwashed and lobotomized by Junko and Mukuro, after firstly demonstrating the loyalty of their followers by having a Reserve Course student commit suicide at Junko's command.

Later, Junko addresses Chiaki via a monitor and traps her inside a test course for her "punishment" center, intended to induce the rest of Nagito's class to her cause via brainwashing. After the events of Danganronpa Zero we see her overlooking the city from the school's roof, along with Mukuro and Izuru, standing triumphant as her plan to "infect" the world with despair, before sending a mass video to the Reserve Course students, brainwashing them into committing mass suicide. Sending Izuru to lead her class in bringing despair to the world, Junko prepares for the coming apocalypse.

Several months later, shortly before the events of Danganronpa: Trigger Happy Havoc, Junko and Mukuro assist their class in converting the academy into a bunker to protect them from the chaos outside, while secretly preparing to have them detained to begin their killing game. After Makoto unknowingly displays his "ultimate luck", which Junko finds is hard to predict, she rejects the implication to kill him, seeing it as a challenge for her if someone as "ordinary" like Makoto could ever potentially defeat her, unknowingly setting up her own end, though poetically, it was not Makoto's luck that caused her undoing but his heart.

In the "Future and Hope Arc" of Danganronpa 3: The End of Hope's Peak High School, set after the events of the second game, Junko makes a cameo appearance in the title sequence and in a flashback to her using blackmail to arrange to have her role in the fall of Hope's Peak Academy hidden from public knowledge. Later, a manifestation of Junko appears in Chisa's mind, talking with the spirit of Chisa while watching the events of the "final killing game."

=== Other appearances ===
Junko Enoshima appears in the Japanese manga adaptation of the series, written and illustrated by Touya Hajime and published by Enterbrain, as well as the spin-off Killer Killer. The series was published in the United States by Enterbrain USA. An additional manga series, published by Ichijinsha, was released solely in Japan. Junko is also the main protagonist of the light novel series Danganronpa/Zero. A Japanese series of stage plays based on the series, sponsored by Kellogg's Cornflakes, cast actor Sayaka Kanda as Junko Enoshima, adapting the events of the first two games and the anime series and featuring Nobuyo Ōyama and TARAKO reprising their roles as Monokuma from the video game series.

Junko is depicted in the 2019 Spike Chunsoft game AI: The Somnium Files, in which protagonists Date and his A.I. Aiba discover an autograph left by Junko in the titular somnium, featuring a drawing of herself with two Monokuma robots. The game is additionally implied to be set in the same fictional universe as Danganronpa in the resulting conversation between the duo.

Junko is included as a playable character in a 2020 crossover event of the NetEase horror game, Identity V, alongside her Monokuma form and fellow Danganronpa characters Makoto Naegi and Kyoko Kirigiri, where she (in either form) pursues the latter pair with a hammer, with the intent of executing them.

== Reception ==
Junko Enoshima has generally been praised by critics as "a powerful and dynamic figure [whose] legacy lives on in [all] subsequent games." In 2019, Polygon ranked her as one of the best video game characters of the 2010s decade while Comic Book Resources ranked her as the villain with the 3rd highest body count in manga and anime in 2020. In 2013 poll from Anime Trend, Junko was voted as the ninth best female character from the year based on her appearances in Danganronpa: The Animation. In a Danganronpa: The Animation poll, Junko took the ninth place. Comic Book Resources listed her as the third most intelligent character from the franchise, citing how she manipulates most of the game's characters to entertain herself even if costs her own sister's life. Kotaku praised her characterization in the Danganronpa Zero light novel for providing more depth to her characterization in contrast to her lack of screentime in the first game as a result of appearing in the final act. In a 2021 poll, Junko was voted as the tenth best Danganronpa character.

Since the release of Danganronpa: Trigger Happy Havoc in November 2010, Junko has become one of its most popular characters, with several memes (such as "Junko posing") being made about her. Junko and Monokuma were collectively named as the "Most Popular Game Character for Cosplay" in the Guinness World Records Gamer's Edition in 2018.

Junko returns in the Despair Arc from the anime. Beckett enjoyed her return as an antagonist based on her traits. Thanasis Karavasilis from Manga Tokyo was also pleased with Junko's return but felt the other characters from the Despair Arc managed to be as entertaining as her. Kotaku claimed that Hajime's transformation into Izuru and his team up with Junko served as one of the biggest attractions from the anime's Despair Arc. Manga.Tokyo also compared Nagito with Izuru, due to both of them sharing characterization similarities, mainly their talents, and wondered whether the two would fight. Destructoid called Junko the best character in the entire franchise for how she embodies the themes often discussed in the series by the cast and how due to popular demand, her legacy continues in following installments despite her death.
