= Danganronpa Kirigiri =

Japanese light novel series

- Cover of the fourth light novel

ダンガンロンパ霧切
- Genre: Detective; Mystery
- Light novel
- Written by: Takekuni Kitayama
- Illustrated by: Rui Komatsuzaki
- Published by: Seikaisha
- Original run: September 13, 2013 – June 17, 2020
- Volumes: 7
- icon

Danganronpa Kirigiri (Japanese: ダンガンロンパ霧切) is a Japanese detective mystery light novel series written by Takekuni Kitayama and illustrated by Rui Komatsuzaki. It was published by Seikaisha from September 13, 2013, to June 17, 2020, and has been collected in seven tankōbon volumes. A prequel to Danganronpa: Trigger Happy Havoc, the series focus on the future "Ultimate Detective" Kyoko Kirigiri over the course of the story as she rises through the ranks of the Detective Shelf Collection (DSC), solving various mysteries alongside her assistant, Yui Samidare.

Proposed by Danganronpa creator Kazutaka Kodaka, following a pitch from Kitayama, elements of the series were incorporated into Danganronpa 2: Goodbye Despair, Danganronpa Another Episode: Ultra Despair Girls, and Danganronpa 3: The End of Hope's Peak Academy. Receiving a universally positive critical reception, Spike Chunsoft ordered a spin-off video game of the series, also written and directed by Kitayama, and titled Kirigiri Sou, for release in October 2016. In November 2016, Danganronpa Kirigiri was nominated for the 2017 Sugoi Japan Award for "Best Entertainment Novel", ranking second behind Your Name.

== Plot summary ==
Serving as a prequel to the events of Danganronpa: Trigger Happy Havoc and Danganronpa Zero, the story of Danganronpa Kirigiri takes place during the middle school years of Kyoko Kirigiri and her assistant Yui Samidare, as they explore the mystery of the Duel Noir cases, a legal succession of death games perpetrated by the über-rich.

== Characters ==
Yui Samidare (五月雨 結, Samidare Yui) – The main character, an originally sixteen-year-old member of the Detective Shelf Collection (DSC) who becomes assistant to Kyoko Kirigiri, who is three years younger than her, writing of their experiences together in solving crimes. Having become a detective to find her sister's killer, Yui is killed in an explosion during the seventh volume.

Kyoko Kirigiri (霧切 響子, Kirigiri Kyōko) – The title character, the future "Ultimate Detective" whose family have been detectives for generations. Seeking to return the Kirigiri name to its former position after being abandoned by her father following her mother's death to be raised by her grandfather, Kyoko meets her assistant Yui at 13-years-old, after being involved together in a murder case, the series following the pair over the course of the story. In the seventh volume, Kyoko has the flesh burned off of her hands while trying to rescue Yui from the aftermath of an explosion.

Suisei Nanamura (七村 彗星, Nanamura Suisei) – An elite detective of ambiguous morals known by the media as The Fastest Passion "Allegro Agitato" (激情にして最速 "アレグロ・アジタート", "Areguro Ajitāto" Gekijō ni Shite Saisoku), who specializes in homicide, who was formerly assisted by Polaris P. Polanski. In the second volume, Suisei is revealed to be gay.

Licorne (リコーン, Rikōn) – A male androgynous Triple-Zero Detective of the Detective Library introduced in the third volume of the series, commonly nicknamed Lico (リコ, Rikō).

Sachi Mizuiyama (水井 山 幸, Mizuiyama Sachi) – A rank-7 detective specializing in technological crime introduced in the third volume of the series.

Fuhito Kirigiri (霧切 不比等, Kirigiri Fuhito) – Kyoko's paternal grandfather and adoptive parent, a master detective who trained his granddaughter in honing her detective skills.

Tohachiro Uzuchi (うずちとはちろう, Uzuchi Tōhachirō) – Kyoko's maternal grandfather, a master of seven Japanese martial arts who taught his granddaughter in self-defense.

Jin Kirigiri (霧切 仁, Kirigiri Jin) – The Headmaster of Hope's Peak Academy and Kyoko's estranged father, who abandoned her as a child.

Copycat (コピーキャット, Kopīkyatto) – A tall European assassin dressed as Little Red Riding Hood who kills her targets by impersonating the M.O. of local serial killers in the corresponding country or state she is in, in particular Genocide Jack.

Night Flyer (コピーキャット, Kopīkyatto) – A short Romanian assassin in possession of a private jet, which he uses to flee after publicly killing his targets with a silenced pistol.

Tsurugi Hitomoshi (つるぎ ひともし, Hitomoshi Tsurugi) – An assassin and former "Ultimate Rock Climber" of Hope's Peak Academy, capable of scaling walls with his bare hands and bending metal and bone, having previously illegally climbed Angkor Watt and the Eiffel Tower.

Norman (ノーマン) – The "host" of the Duel Noir at the Norman Hotel. Supposedly modeled after a serial killer from roughly 50 years ago (likely a reference to Norman Bates), he only appears as a painting shown on a video screen in pre-recorded messages.

Makoto Naegi (苗木 誠, Naegi Makoto) – The "Ultimate Lucky Student" of Hope's Peak Academy and classmate of Kyoko's, who becomes her future partner.

== Volumes ==
The series has been collected into seven tankōbon volumes, the first of which was published in September 2013 and the last of which was published in June 2020.

| No. | Japanese release date | Japanese ISBN |
|---|---|---|
| 1 | September 13, 2013 | 978-4-06-1388758 |
| 2 | November 29, 2013 | 978-4-06-1388857 |
| 3 | November 28, 2014 | 978-4-06-1399068 |
| 4 | December 26, 2015 | 978-4-06-1399303 |
| 5 | March 15, 2017 | 978-4-06-1399600 |
| 6 | February 17, 2018 | 978-4-06-5111505 |
| 7 | June 17, 2020 (Note: The release date of the seventh volume of Danganronpa Kirigiri was pushed back six months to June 17, 2020 due to the COVID-19 pandemic.) | 978-4-06-5175330 |

== Video game ==
In October 2016, a spin-off "sound" visual novel, entitled Kirigiri Sou, was quietly released by Spike Chunsoft. A stand-alone sequel to the events of Danganronpa Kirigiri, Takekuni Kitayama revealed that he had been hired to develop the game (his first video game project, and a crossover with Otogirisō) due to the widespread success of the first three volumes of his novel series in Japan.

== Reception ==
Danganronpa Kirigiri was nominated for the "Best Entertainment Novel" category at the 2017 Sugoi Japan Awards, ultimately losing to Your Name. In December 2022, Game Rant lauded the series as one of the best light novel adaptations of video games, complimenting the series' "dedicated fanbase [for] releasing amazing fan translations that are well worth tracking down".
