= Otogirisō =

1992 video game

- Super Famicom cover art
- Developer: Chunsoft
- Publisher: Chunsoft
- Director: Koichi Nakamura
- Producer: Koichi Nakamura
- Writers: Shukei Nagasaka; Kazuya Asano; Osamu Yamazaki; Takashi Tsuzuki
- Composer: Chiyoko Mitsumata
- Platforms: Super Famicom; PlayStation
- Release: Super Famicom: JP: 7 March 1992; PlayStation: JP: 25 March 1999
- Genre: Visual novel
- Mode: Single player

Otogirisō (Note: Japanese: 弟切草; lit. Hypericum erectum) is a 1992 visual novel video game developed and published by Chunsoft for the Super Famicom. It is about an unnamed protagonist and his girlfriend Nami who are lost down a forest road. After having to make an emergency stop, they find themselves in a Western-styled country house. On entering, they stumble upon a mummified person who quickly vanishes when the lights go out. Further unexplainable phenomena happen as the two explore the mansion, and the two discover that Nami has a history with the house and its previous occupants. The game involves the player making various choices through menu options to direct the narrative of the story. Completing a narrative in the game allows the player to reach new menu branches and narrative conclusions.

Director Koichi Nakamura developed the game following the financial success Chunsoft had with their Dragon Quest series. On attempting to attract new audiences, Chunsoft developed a simplified game where the player only chose various narrative branches via menu options to progress the story, later describing this type of game as a "Sound Novel". On its release for the Super Famicom, reviewers in Weekly Famitsu found the game difficult to review, but recommended it for adventure game fans. In January 1993, GAME Pia magazine included Otogirisō in their list of the best games of 1992. The game sold around 300,000 copies.

Otogirisō was adapted into a radio drama in 1992 and a film in 2001. A video game remake titled Otogirisō Soseihen was released in 1999 for the PlayStation, while an Otogirisō game titled Kirigirisō was released in 2016. Along with Chunsoft's Banshee's Last Cry (1994), Otogirisō had a direct influence on contemporary visual novel games due to their unique format of placing text over illustrated backgrounds rather than confining it to dedicated text boxes. This style would become the model for similar games such as Leaf's Shizuku (1996) and Kizuato (1996).

== Gameplay ==
The player progresses and affects the narrative by selecting text options.

Otogirisō is a sound novel, a term academic Rebecca Crawford described as being applied to Chunsoft's 20th century visual novel games. It features background graphics as animated illustrations of the narrative as well as background music and sound effects such as doors creaking open, footsteps and screams. Otogirisō has its players advance by reading the in-game text and influencing how the story will proceed by choosing from a list of options that are presented to them at key points in the narrative.

The game keeps track of how many times they have progressed to a narrative ending in the game, and how many choices they have made. Outside of choosing menu options to progress the story, the player can also move backwards and forwards through parts of the story they have already read. After reaching an ending of a narrative, the player can restart the game and unlock more options to choose from during the narrative, leading to new storylines and endings. After seeing all the regular endings, the bookmark on the data selection screen turns pink and allows for a playthrough that contains more meta-jokes and adult-themed options.

== Plot ==
The protagonist (Note: The player character has no name in the 1992 game. In the PlayStation version, he is named Kouhei.) drives down through a forest road with his girlfriend Nami. She asks about the flowers growing down the road, which the protagonist explains are hypericum, or the "otogirisou". Suddenly the brakes of the car stop working and after an oncoming car rushes by, the protagonist gets the car to come to an emergency stop. Neither Nami or the protagonist are hurt as they leave the car. They see a flickering light in the distance when a strike of lighting hits a tree crushing their car. As rain falls, Nami and the protagonist follow a trail of flowers following the light they saw earlier and stumble upon a Western-style country mansion.

The two enter the house in various ways, such as ramming into the door or breaking a window, and find themselves in a room that is completely silent with only a murky aquarium and suit of armor worth investigating. They call out to see if anyone was there, but there was no response. After hearing noises upstairs, they discover a room which is dimly lit. The door closes behind them and they suddenly see an old mummified woman in a wheelchair. The power goes out and after hearing the sound of creaking wheelchair, the power returns and the room is revealed to be empty. They exit to investigate, finding the suit of armor downstairs is missing.

On reinvestigating the room they were in, they discover a diary with the last entry being six years ago written in blood. They continue exploring the mansion further, find unexplained phenomena such as a disconnected phone ringing and a door that is nailed shut and a kitchen where food is prepared. After hearing a woman scream outside, they explore outside and find a greenhouse where otogirisou flowers are cultivated. When they return to the mansion, they find the name "Nami" written in red on the door.

On returning the mansion, the two seek a washroom as Nami had gotten her clothes soiled outside, and decided to each take turns taking a shower. Finding the shower too hot, the protagonist enters the basement to lower the temperature on the water heater. After the protagonist showers after Nami, Nami has vanished. Outside the washroom, Nami appears in a dress but vanishes instantly. On looking for her further, the protagonist find the real Nami in a room with two dolls. The dolls make Nami realize she lived in the mansion with her mother and her sister Naomi.

Depending on choices made during the story and how many times the player has gone through the game, various concluding narratives are revealed ranging from Nami's relationship with the family members who remain in the mansion to the characters being hunted by a fish monster. The narratives generally lead to the water heater in the basement exploding, leading to the protagonist and Nami leaving the mansion together as it collapses in flames.

== Production ==
Chunsoft announced the development of Otogirisou in April 1991. The game was developed at the same time as Dragon Quest V (1992). The game's director Koichi Nakamura had previously been involved with the development of the first three Dragon Quest games, and recalled that he was dating a girl at the time who did not play video games. When she tried playing the games that Nakamura had helped develop, she expressed that she did not really understand the games or what was supposed to be fun about them. This led to Nakamura thinking he should make a game that he described as "for people who haven't played games before." He thought of older text adventures, ultimately deciding that would be too complicated for a new audience. Programmer Manabu Yamana said prior to the idea of the sound novel, the team attempted a game that would contain elements of Dragon Quest, Sim City (1989), and Populous (1989) which he said "didn't work at all." Kazuya Asano said he recalled that Nakamura told him that he was also inspired by reading a novel by Yasutaka Tsutsui in high school that suggested listening to a specific song in the margins of the paper while reading. Nakamura said that this is what he wanted to do something similar for their next project.

Screenshots of Otogirisō from the May 17, 1991 issue of Famicom Tsūshin. The game initially was developed with no background graphics.

In contrast to the lighter comical action games and fantasy games at the time, Nakamura had worked on previously, the game was set in the real world and made in the horror genre. He described the influence of developing a horror-themed game at the time lied in the video game Sweet Home (1989), saying: "there weren't any real horror games. But right around the time I was thinking of making Otogirisō, Capcom created Sweet Home. The thing that was really interesting about Sweet Home was that it so scary that you didn't want to continue playing. I wanted to create an experience where the user would be too afraid to press the button to continue the story, too."

Shukei Nagasaka, a screenwriter, novelist and television writer, wrote the original story and script for Otogirisō. It was his idea to have players be able to move between narratives during development. Nakamura then began developing a game that would be simplified further by having it be decision-based, where the player reads the story and chooses different options at branching points to give players a certain level of interaction with the game. He said that would make a game "anybody could pick up, and maybe it would also lead them to playing other games in the future." As the price of the game was about 8,800 Japanese yen which was roughly the price of ten books, the game was made to include multiple narratives. Nakamura said the stories in Otogirisō ended up getting larger than they had initially imagined, making it difficult to test to make sure the narrative flowed appropriately and that sound effects went off at the correct time in the story.

Initially, the game was developed as text on top of a paper texture graphic. On test plays with audiences with this version, Nakamura said that the game split the audience saying it tested better with the parents of grade school children than the more hardcore Famicom players. When the game was first shown at the Shoshinkai trade show, it still contained its paper texture and occasional animations. The response at the trade show from distributors and magazine companies were that it would be hard to sell without more graphics, leading to about 20 graphics made for the backgrounds in the game. The addition of adding illustrations and background art to the game delayed for about a year. At this point the scenario was completed, but Asano said he still tinkered with the script while Nakamura also stayed up at night writing scripts and adjusting the timing for graphics and sound effects to display. Asano said that there was a lot of trial and error in getting the timing of the text to display on the screen. He said that the developers eventually settled on a format where each character was displayed one by one, stopped at commas, and the next sentence began when a button was pressed.

== Release ==
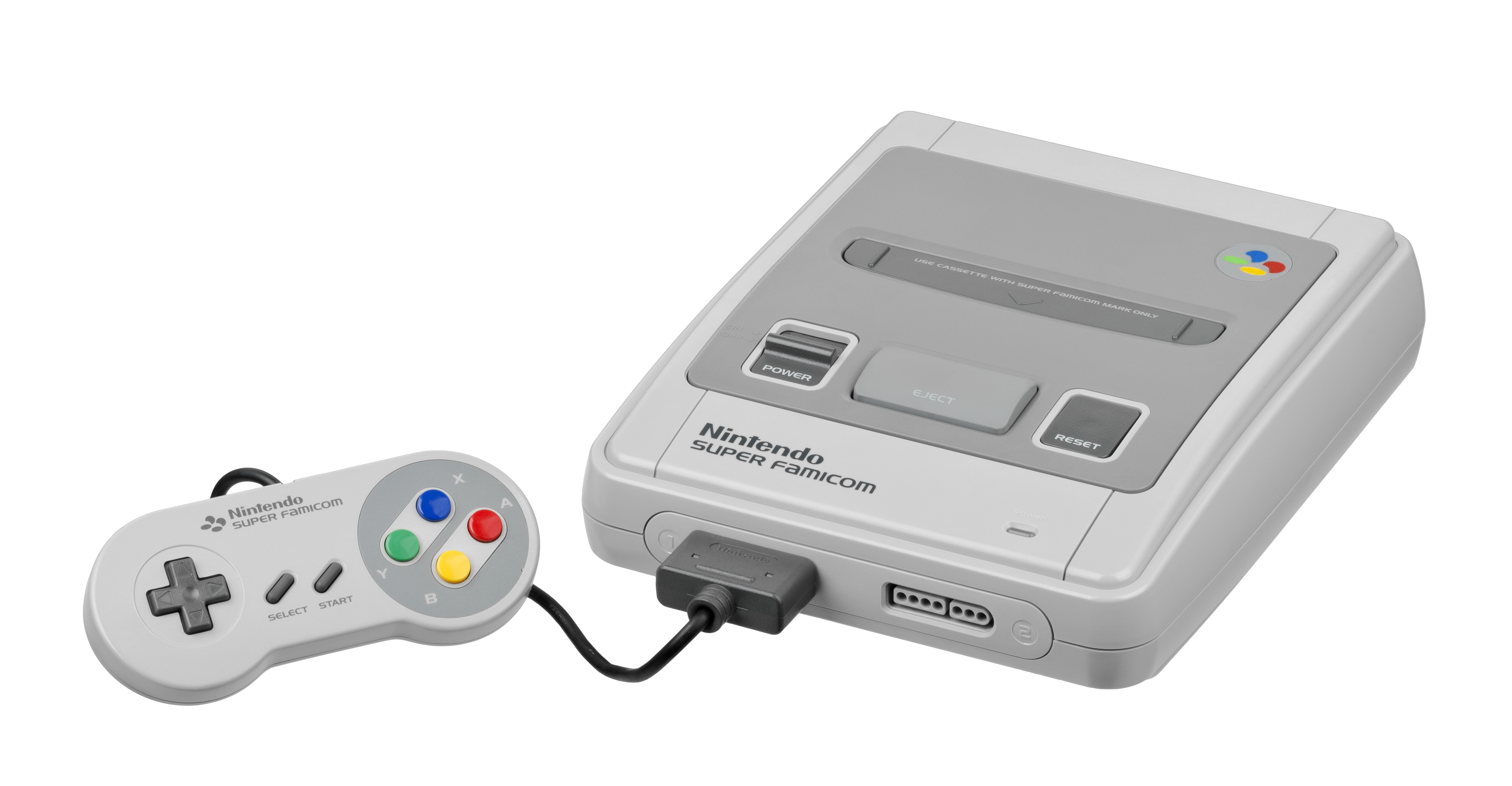
Otogirisō was first released for the Super Famicom.

Otogirisō was initially set to release on July 7, 1991. It was released for the Super Famicom on March 7, 1992. It became the first game published by Chunsoft themselves, having relied on companies such as Enix previously. Nakamura said that it was easy to get funds to become a publisher at the time due the bubble economy of Japan at the time.

Otogirisō was projected to sell 400,000 copies. The game was described as selling "quite high" in Japan by Rik Haynes of Super Play, Nakamura said the game initially shifted about 120,000 units. Nakamura joked later that at the time, he wished that it would sell more. The game eventually shipped over 300,000 units. By 1996, Game-On! described Otogiriso as a relatively hard game to find.

The game was released digitally in Japan through Nintendo's Virtual Console for the Wii on 28 August 2007, and on the Wii U on 30 July 2014. On 6 March 2024, an unofficial English translation of Otogirisō was released by Translated.games.

On 23 July 1998, Chunsoft announced that along with the games Banshee's Last Cry (1994) and Machi (1998), Otogirisō would be remade as part of the Sound Novel Evolution (Note: サウンドノベル・エボリューション, Saundonoberu eboryūshon; lit. Sound Novel Evolution) series. This version of the game was titled Otogirisō Soseihen (Note: 弟切草 蘇生篇; lit. Otogirisou Resurrection). This version of the game features new sound effects, graphics, and the ability to change the games perspective from the protagonist to that of Nami. Chunsoft said the release would be postponed in October and re-announced in February 1999 that the game would be released on 25 March. Nakamura said in interview from 2006 that the PlayStation version of the game sold around 100,000 copies. The Otogirisō Soseihen version of the game was made available digitally on the PlayStation Store in Japan in September 2011.

== Reception ==
Reception

Review scores
Publication	Score	
Publication	PS	SNES
Dengeki PlayStation	80/100, 85/100	N/A
The Super Famicom	N/A	7/10
Weekly Famitsu	8/10, 7/10, 8/10, 7/10 (Note: Each of the four reviewers in Famitsu scored the game on a ten point scale)	6/10, 6/10, 7/10, 6/10

Michiko Ishino writing for Hippon Super! magazine reviewed a pre-release version of Otogirisō. He found the game was good at developing atmosphere, but wished the writing was more carefully crafted. The reviewer opted to not give a customary number grade, explaining that it should not be treated on the same level as other games.

For the original Super Famicom release, the four reviewers in Weekly Famitsu said that Otogirisō will be very divisive and found it difficult to evaluate. Two of the authors found that there may have been too many different stories in the release and two recommending for fans of films and the horror genre. One reviewer included as one of the best releases of the week with the requirement that the player enjoys adventure games. Yutaka Noguchi of Weekly Famitsu later commented on the game, writing that it had simple graphics which made it an "unusually restrained production". Noguchi complimented the ability to form a protagonist that ranged from timid to being comic relief and found that having more selectable narrative moves based on how many times you've cleared the game as an innovative system. While finding the release closer to a novel than a video game, he praised Otogirisō, saying that no mater how it is received, the release takes a step forward in game design and that alone took courage. Reviewers in The Super Famicom magazine also found it closer to a novel than an adventure game, with one reviewer saying they were glad the text in it was a mixture of kanji and katakana, as if it were only the latter, they would not want to read it. Two reviewers in the magazine also thought the game was overpriced for what it contained.

In an overview of the video games of 1992, The Super Famicom magazine said that in an era where there were no adventure for the Super Famicom, Otogirisō truly stood out. The publication complimented the immersive presentation but found it the game to be overpriced and did not deliver the level of excitement as expected. While complimenting that its multiple stories, they found that the differences in them were not that significant. In January 1993, GAME Pia magazine included Otogirisō in their list of the best games of 1992.

In an article on Japanese games in Nintendo Power, an anonymous writer commented that "to American gamers who have made fast-action games the biggest sellers, the concept of a video mystery novel would seem quite foreign. The experienced Japanese players we talked to thought it was an interesting change and commented that the great sound made the game." Jeremy Parish of Polygon discussed the game in 2018, stating that it "could perhaps be written off as little more than a digital version of the old Choose Your Own Adventure books of the '80s. However, the mature writing combined with the eerie atmosphere created by the graphics and music set the game apart from anything that had come before."

The four reviewers in the Japanese video game magazine Weekly Famitsu found that the PlayStation version of the game new graphics made the game scarier and enjoyed being able to play the game from Nami's perspective. The two reviewers in Dengeki PlayStation magazine also complimented the new graphics and the ability to view the game from Nami's perspective. Bag Koji said it was his choice of the top game in the Sound Novel Evolution trilogy.

== Legacy ==
Towards the final quarter of 1992, Otogirisō began appear in other forms of media. This included its music from the game being recorded by the Tokyo Memorial Orchestra and released on compact disc by Warner Music Japan and a radio drama adaptation which was broadcast on Japanese satellite radio on 5 December. On April 10, 1999, a novel of Otogirisō was released by Kadokawa Horror Bunko. It is an original story that only contains similar elements to the original Chunsoft release. A film adaption of the game titled St. John's Wort was released in Japan on 27 January 2001. It was released in both an English dub and subtitled edition by Asylum Home Entertainment in March 2004. After the release of Otogirisō, a sequel was planned with Nakamura saying the script for the game did not progress very well. When asked about Otogirisō in 2022, Kazuya Asano responded that that the game was "just okay."

In the book History of the Japanese Video Game Industry, published in 2023, Yuhsuke Koyama wrote that while many adventure games were released in the late 1980s in Japan, the number of titles had rapidly decreased following 1989 with only a few mystery-themed games or games featuring characters from manga and anime being released. The popularity of the genre would return in Japan with the release of Otogirisō and the later personal computer (PC) games that were influenced by it. In a review of Banshee's Last Cry in 1994, a reviewer in Famicom Tsūshin said that there have been many games inspired by Otogiriso, but most were just re-hashes. While games described as novel-styled games had existed on PCs in Japan since DOME (1988), Koyama said that Otogirisō and Chunsoft's Banshee's Last Cry were the two works that had a direct influence on contemporary novel-styled games. This included the format of placing text over illustrated backgrounds rather than confining it to a box dedicated for dialogue. Academic Ko On Chan said that this style used in Otogirisō and Banshee's Last Cry allowed for more text on screen which intensified the experience of reading through sound effects and illustrations. This style subsequently became the genesis for similar games, such as Leaf's Shizuku (1996) and Kizuato (1996). Jiro Ishii, a game developer who worked on Chunsoft's 428: Shibuya Scramble (2008), said that Otogirisō created a new structure for adventure games called the "loop structure". This style did not have the linear narrative structure seen in games like The Portopia Serial Murder Case (1983) or Snatcher (1988), and would instead have the plot repeat the same period of time over and over. The "pink bookmark" feature in the game became a staple in subsequent novel-styled games from Chunsoft.

A new game based around Otogirisou was announced in October 2016 titled Kirigirisō. The game's scenario was written by Kitayama Takekuni, author of Danganronpa: Kirigiri (2013–2020) and features the character Kyoko Kirigiri from Spike Chunsoft's Danganronpa series. The game was released in November 2016 for Windows-based home computers.

== See also ==
- List of Super Nintendo Entertainment System games
- Video games in Japan
