= List of Danganronpa characters =

Danganronpa video game characters

Danganronpa series
- The characters of Danganronpa: Trigger Happy Havoc. Makoto Naegi, Kyoko Kirigiri, and Monokuma (front row) would be recurring characters in the series.
- First appearance: Danganronpa: Trigger Happy Havoc (2010)
- Last appearance: Danganronpa S: Ultimate Summer Camp (2021)
- Created by: Kazutaka Kodaka

The following is a list of characters from the Spike Chunsoft video game series Danganronpa. The series follows the students of Hope's Peak Academy who are forced into a life of mutual killing by a sadistic teddy bear named Monokuma. The series consists of three games, Danganronpa: Trigger Happy Havoc (2010), Danganronpa 2: Goodbye Despair (2012) and Danganronpa Another Episode: Ultra Despair Girls (2014), along with a standalone sequel game, Danganronpa V3: Killing Harmony (2017), various spin-off novels and manga including Danganronpa Zero (2011), Kirigiri (2013–2020), Genocider Mode (2015–2017), Togami (2015–2017), and Killer Killer (2016–2017), and two anime television series, one an adaptation of the first game in 2013 and the other a sequel and finale, Danganronpa 3: The End of Hope's Peak High School (2016). Where available, this article uses spellings and terminology featured in the English video games.

== Overview ==
Key
Main character (receives star billing)
Recurring character (guest appearances in two or more case)
Guest character (appearing in one case)
This table only shows main protagonists/antagonists and characters that have appeared in two or more installments in the series.

Character
Character	Video games						Literature				
Character	Main series			Spin-offs			Novels			Manga	
Character	THH	2:GD	V3:KH	DAA:UDG	KS	S:USC	Zero	Kirigiri	Togami	GM	DG:KK
Character	2010	2012	2017	2014	2016	2021	2011	2013–2020	2015–2017		2016–2017
Protagonists
Makoto Naegi	Main	Guest	Guest	Guest		Main	Guest	Guest	Guest	Guest	Guest
Kyoko Kirigiri	Main	Guest	Guest		Main	Main	Main	Main			Guest
Byakuya Togami	Main	Main	Guest	Main		Main			Main	Main	
Toko Fukawa	Main		Guest	Main		Main			Guest	Main	
Hajime Hinata		Main	Guest	Guest		Main	Guest			Guest	Guest
Shuichi Saihara			Main			Main					
Kaede Akamatsu			Main			Main					
Komaru Naegi	Guest		Guest	Main		Main				Main	
Kouhei Matsudaira					Main						
Yui Samidare								Main			
Blue Ink									Main		
Misaki Asano											Main
Takumi Hijirihara											Main
Antagonists
Monokuma	Main	Main	Main	Main		Main				Guest	Guest
Junko Enoshima	Main	Main	Main	Guest		Main	Main		Guest	Guest	Guest
Mukuro Ikusaba	Main		Guest			Main	Main		Guest		Main
Nagito Komaeda		Main	Guest	Main		Main				Main	
Sonia Nevermind		Main	Guest			Main			Main		
Kazuichi Soda		Main	Guest			Main			Main		
Tsumugi Shirogane			Main			Main					
Monokubs			Main			Main					
Warriors of Hope			Guest	Main						Main	
Suisei Nanamura								Main	Main		

== Monokuma ==
Voiced by (English): Brian Beacock (game); Greg Ayres (anime)
Voiced by (Japanese): Nobuyo Ōyama (2010–2015); Tarako (2016 – 2024)

Monokuma (モノクマ; lit. bear-thing or bear-person) is the antagonist of the series. He is an anthropomorphic teddy bear who proclaims himself to be the headmaster of Hope's Peak Academy and initiates a life of mutual killing among the students. He has various copies of himself throughout the academy and punishes anyone that attempts to attack him or breaks the academy's rules.

Visually, Monokuma is divided into two halves. His right half is a cute white teddy bear with black details and grey shading; his left half has black fur, a red eye, and an evil smirk.

The identity of Monokuma's controller, as well as his motives for bringing the students together, are central to the mysteries that the students must investigate. In the first two games, Monokuma was used as a proxy for Junko Enoshima in her trials; in Another Episode, he is a series of different types of robots created by Monaca Towa for an army; in Danganronpa 3, recordings of him are set up by Kazuo Tengan to force Ryota Mitarai into brainwashing the entire world for the sake of hope. He is the only returning character in Danganronpa V3 as a part of the Ultimate Academy for Gifted Juveniles, now controlled by Team Danganronpa and accompanied by the Monokubs (Monokuma Kubs). His execution is named "Ultimate Annihilation".

== Danganronpa: Trigger Happy Havoc ==
=== Makoto Naegi ===
Makoto Naegi (苗木 誠, Naegi Makoto)
Voiced by (English): Bryce Papenbrook
Voiced by (Japanese): Megumi Ogata

The protagonist of the first game. An ordinary high school student who was accepted to the academy by raffle. He has no spectacular talents, aside from his belief that he is a bit more optimistic than most people, and was given the title of Ultimate Lucky Student (超高校級の「幸運」, Chō kōkō-kyū no "Kōun"; lit. Super High School Level Good Luck) due to winning a raffle run by Hope's Peak Academy. He falls prey to bad luck more often than not. It is revealed in a short story that Makoto's luck comes from the fact that his bad luck is so powerful that it cancels the good luck of anyone around him, to the point where he got a fellow Lucky Student candidate eliminated just by standing near the mailman carrying her acceptance letter. Though his good luck rarely manifests, it is immensely powerful in its own right, allowing outcomes that are nearly statistically impossible to occur, such as getting the Escape Switch from the item machine or surviving his near-execution. His talent also proves instrumental in undoing Junko's plans, as his bizarre luck completely throws off her analytical abilities. While having the tendency to panic or let his emotions get the better of him, he can remain focused under pressure and shows a keen sense of logic when piecing together mysteries. He is instrumental in solving all of the murder mysteries, and foils Monokuma's plot, earning the title of Ultimate Hope (超高校級の「希望」, Chō kōkō-kyū no "Kibō"; lit. Super High School Level Hope). He escapes from the academy alive and joins an organization called the Future Foundation, dedicated to rebuilding the world and fighting against Junko's legacy.

During the events of Danganronpa 2, he and the other survivors attempt to rehabilitate some of the Remnants of Despair by placing them inside a virtual world which would get rid of their despair brainwashing. However, because of a virus containing Junko's Alter Ego, the world is turned into another killing game, prompting Makoto, Kyoko and Byakuya to eventually enter the virtual world themselves to help the surviving students activate a shutdown sequence to stop Junko once and for all. Makoto also appears in Danganronpa Another Episode. He returns as the protagonist of Danganronpa 3, where he becomes involved in Monokuma's Monokuma Hunter game. His forbidden action is "running in the hallway." After surviving the Monokuma Hunter game, Makoto becomes the headmaster of the rebuilt Hope's Peak Academy, a role he retains in Danganronpa V3: Killing Harmony within Tsumugi Shirogane's "Flashback Light" false narrative as a part of the "Ultimate Real Fiction" Danganronpa reality television series.

=== Kyoko Kirigiri ===
Kyoko Kirigiri (霧切 響子, Kirigiri Kyōko)
Voiced by (English): Erika Harlacher (game); Caitlin Glass (anime)
Voiced by (Japanese): Yoko Hikasa

Kyoko is a mysterious woman who has amnesia but also possesses a cool head and reasoning skills. At the beginning of the game, her talent is unknown, so her presented title is Ultimate ??? (超高校級の「???」, Chō kōkō-kyū no "???"; lit. Super High School Level ???). While generally untrusting of others, she comes to believe in Makoto and helps him out on many occasions and in the class trials. She later finds out her title is Ultimate Detective (超高校級の「探偵」, Chō kōkō-kyū no "Tantei"; lit. Super High School Level Detective), having had more of her memories removed than the others due to how her talent would hinder Monokuma's plans. She always wears a pair of gloves, which is later revealed to be for hiding burns scars she received on her hands. She is also the daughter of Hope's Peak Academy's headmaster, Jin Kirigiri. She survives the game, escapes from the academy, and becomes a member of the Future Foundation.

In Danganronpa 2, she joins Makoto and Byakuya in confronting Junko's Alter Ego. In Danganronpa 3, she becomes involved in the Monokuma Hunter game alongside other Future Foundation members. She is presumably killed by the poison in her wristband as a result of her forbidden action, "passing the fourth time limit with Makoto still alive." At the end of the series, it is revealed she had survived thanks to an antidote created by Seiko, which slowed the poison's effects and put her in a coma until Mikan revived her. She then becomes a teacher at the new Hope's Peak Academy. She is the title character of the spin-off novel series Danganronpa Kirigiri, where she, along with her friend and assistant Yui, becomes involved in a series of deadly "Duel Noir" death games.

She was known as Gyaru Kirigiri (霧切ギャル, Kirigiri Gyaru) and was the original first victim in the narrative's killing game of an early demo for Trigger-Happy Havoc. The concept behind Kyoko's traits originated from Kodaka's desire to add a detective to the first Danganronpa game. Although she has a prominent role in the story, Kodaka claimed he did not write her with the intention of creating a lead heroine. Instead, Kyoko's utility to the player and the unique thought process she provided as a detective naturally elevated her to that role over time. In order to balance the cast Kodaka conceived the idea of giving the students no recollection of their past at Hope's Peak Academy. As a result, Kyoko remains the unofficial detective of the group and is not officially revealed to be a detective until later in the game.

Although artist Rui Komatsuzaki made Kyoko, Kodaka was responsible for most of the elements of Kyoko's appearance. Kodaka wanted Kyoko's design to hint at her detective role. This desire is most prominent in her black gloves and black jacket.

Komatsuzaki has claimed that Kyoko was one of the most difficult female characters to create in the first game of the franchise. At first, the staff decided that Kyoko would be attributed to be a "mysterious girl". This originally resulted in her color scheme being toneless and monotone. However, the design soon had to be altered after the game's direction changed to the lighter "Psycho Pop" art style. Her monotone color scheme was then changed to a pastel purple. Her early design prominently featured a school uniform with overalls because Komatsuzaki wanted it to have a rarer design than the other female characters; her uniform was later changed to a blouse and skirt. Komatsusaki had difficulties deciding between a shorter or longer hairstyle for Kyoko. Producer Yoshinori Terasawa suggested that Kyoko could have a symbolic hair cutting scene in the first game, but the idea was ultimately rejected, and so Kyoko's hair remained long. Because Kyoko becomes the main heroine after Sayaka's death, Komatsuzaki wanted Kyoko's design to closely parallel Sayaka's, and their similar hairstyles in different shades was a deliberate choice.

=== Byakuya Togami ===
Byakuya Togami (十神 白夜, Togami Byakuya)
Voiced by (English): Jason Wishnov (game); Jessie James Grelle (anime)
Voiced by (Japanese): Akira Ishida

The successor of a highly successful family corporation who considers himself superior to all the other students in the academy. He is cold towards others, seeing them as competition and, as he hates losing, initially refuses to cooperate with their attempts at escaping and investigating. He identifies Makoto as a potential competitor, and after the second murder, in which Mondo Owada bashes Chihiro Fujisaki's skull in with a dumbbell in a fit of jealous rage, alters the crime scene and frames Toko Fukawa for Chihiro's death. He becomes more amicable to the group after Sakura's death. He is one of the survivors that escape from the academy and become members of the Future Foundation. His title is Ultimate Affluent Progeny (超高校級の「御曹司」, Chō kōkō-kyū no "Onzōshi"; lit. Super High School Level Scion). He appears in Danganronpa 2 alongside Makoto and Kyoko. In Danganronpa Another Episode, he comes to Towa City to rescue Komaru and gives her a Hacking Gun, but gets captured by the Warriors of Hope and is used as a hostage, eventually getting rescued with the help of Komaru and Toko. He stars in the spin-off novel series Danganronpa: Togami, the second novel of which explores his young as young girl detective Polaris P. Polanski (ポラリス・ポランスキー, P. Poransukī Porarisu) and the competition they had to win against their many half-siblings four years before the Tragedy in order to become the Togami heir (against continuing to grow up poor), and reappears in Danganronpa 3.

=== Toko Fukawa ===
Toko Fukawa (腐川 冬子, Fukawa Tōko) and Genocide Jack / Genocide Jill / Genocider Sho (ジェノサイダー翔, Jenosaidā Shō)
Voiced by (English): Amanda Celine Miller/Erin Fitzgerald (game); Carli Mosier (anime)
Voiced by (Japanese): Miyuki Sawashiro

A gloomy girl with a persecution complex who is a best-selling novelist. She possesses a split personality, her other half being a serial killer named Genocide Jack (known as Genocider Sho in the Japanese version and English anime dub), or as she prefers it, Genocide Jill, who crucifies attractive males with sharp scissors. Toko switches between the two whenever she sneezes or passes out, usually due to the sight of blood, allowing Jack to take control. The two personalities share knowledge and emotions, such as their crush on Byakuya, but their memories are separate from each other. As such, Jack is the only one of the group who has memories of the past two years. She is one of the survivors that escapes from the academy. Toko's title is Ultimate Writing Prodigy (超高校級の「文学少女」, Chō kōkō-kyū no "Bungaku Shōjo"; lit. Super High School Level Literary Girl) and Jack calls herself the Ultimate Murderous Fiend (超高校級の「殺人者」, Chō kōkō-kyū no "Satsujinsha"; lit. Super High School Level Serial Killer).

In Danganronpa Another Episode, she has become an honorary member of the Future Foundation, carrying with her a stun-gun that can be used to control Jack at will on the condition that she no longer kill anyone at all. She is sent to Towa City to serve as an escort for Komaru, whom she eventually befriends, as well as to search for Byakuya, who has been captured. She reappears alongside Komaru in Danganronpa 3, where they both confront Monaca.

In developing Toko's characterization, writer/scenario creator Kazutaka Kodaka from Spike Chunsoft considered "[t]he easy thing [to] have been to make her the final boss, the last enemy, the culprit. But my goal in this series is to play to people's expectations, so I said, "No, no, no. Let's turn this around. Let's move to the next level with the personalities and let's go for it." Ultimately, despite the talent of "Ultimate Murderous Fiend", Toko does not kill any characters in the first game, and the game's mastermind is presented as deceased "Ultimate Fashionista" Junko Enoshima. In a subsequent interview with Siliconera, Kodaka stated:

"[Toko Fukawa] is an excellent representation of the series. When I was writing the first game and figuring out what was going to happen to Junko, I started to write Genocide Jack and how different that character was from Toko. While I was writing this I felt this is the kind of tension and tempo I want the series to carry. At the end of the day, I felt Toko represented what Danganronpa was and the kind of storytelling might have." — Kazutaka Kodaka

The character's design was created by lead artist Rui Komatsuzaki, who considers Toko Fukawa and Genocide Jack/Jill his favorite characters, "a unique character all by herself, but with Genocide Jack included we managed to make her ten times more so." Originally designed as a potential mastermind inspired by the character of Alyssa Hale / Mr. Bates from the 1998 video game Clock Tower II: The Struggle Within, Genocide Jack/Jill was designed with the most facial expressions in the first game, having a separate sprite file from her Toko form. This initially proved difficult in order to make a contrast between the personality of Genocide Jack/Jill and the more plain design of Toko, with Komatsuzaki having "thought it would be incredibly tough to make such a severe personality change using the same character design, so my original plan was to base Genocide Jack on Toko's design but change it considerably. I fell back to the current transformation after being told having them look too different would be messy since she transforms back and forth so often." Elements of the original character designs were additionally incorporated into those of Junko Enoshima, Peko Pekoyama, and Tsumugi Shirogane. Toko's English voice actresses were cited as the most challenging to find due to the portrayal of her psychopathic personality Genocide Jill/Jack; ultimately, voice actresses Amanda Céline Miller and Erin Fitzgerald (who also voiced Junko Enoshima) were chosen to voice the characters.

=== Aoi Asahina ===
Aoi Asahina (朝日奈 葵, Asahina Aoi)
Voiced by (English): Cassandra Lee Morris (game); Felecia Angelle (anime)
Voiced by (Japanese): Chiwa Saitō
Nicknamed "Hina" in the English version. A well-meaning, air-headed student who excels in athletic sports, especially swimming, and has a love of donuts. She bonds with Sakura and, following Sakura's suicide, tries to steer the jury towards an incorrect verdict as penance. She is one of the survivors that escape from the academy, becoming a member of the Future Foundation. In Danganronpa 3, she is forced to participate in the Monokuma Hunter game but manages to survive. Her forbidden action is "getting hit with a punch or kick." Her title is Ultimate Swimming Pro (超高校級の「スイマー」, Chō kōkō-kyū no "Suimā"; lit. Super High School Level Swimmer).

=== Yasuhiro Hagakure ===
Yasuhiro Hagakure (葉隠 康比呂, Hagakure Yasuhiro)
Voiced by (English): Kaiji Tang (game); Christopher Bevins (anime)
Voiced by (Japanese): Masaya Matsukaze
Nicknamed "Hiro" in the English version. A laid-back and dimwitted student who is a rising star in the fortune-telling community. He is the eldest in the group, as he was held back several grades, and often ends his sentences with "da be" in the Japanese version of the game. He is one of the survivors that escape from the academy and becomes a member of the Future Foundation (in demo versions and previews, he is the first victim). He appears in the spin-off novel Ultra Despair Hagakure included in Danganronpa Another Episode, helping Kanon Nakajima escape from Towa City. He reappears in Danganronpa 3, where he ends up separated from the other Future Foundation members after the Future Foundation headquarters is attacked, leaving him outside the building. His title is Ultimate Clairvoyant (超高校級の「占い師」, Chō kōkō-kyū no "Uranaishi"; lit. Super High School Level Fortune Teller).

=== Sayaka Maizono ===
Sayaka Maizono (舞園 さやか, Maizono Sayaka)
Voiced by (English): Dorothy Elias-Fahn (game); Monica Rial (anime)
Voiced by (Japanese): Makiko Ohmoto
A cheerful girl who is the leader of a five-member idol group that is nationally popular and attended the same middle school as Makoto. She has particularly good intuition, and thus makes a habit of jokingly claiming to be a psychic. Having learned about her group being captured, Sayaka plans to escape the academy and find them by murdering Leon and placing the blame on Makoto. However, her plan backfires and she is stabbed with her own kitchen knife in her stomach, becoming the first murder victim. Her title is Ultimate Pop Sensation (超高校級の「アイドル」, Chō kōkō-kyū no "Aidoru"; lit. Super High School Level Idol).

=== Leon Kuwata ===
Leon Kuwata (桑田 怜恩, Kuwata Reon)
Voiced by (English): Grant George (game); Justin Cook (anime)
Voiced by (Japanese): Takahiro Sakurai
A brash teenager who is exceptionally good at baseball. Despite this, he desires to quit baseball and become a punk musician instead, as he dislikes the restrictions being a baseball player puts on his style. Having learned about his cousin, Kanon Nakajima, being captured, Leon plans to escape the academy and find her. He stabs Sayaka with her own kitchen knife after her botched attempt to kill him, becoming the first murderer. He is found guilty after Sayaka wrote his name in blood before her death. He is executed by being tied to a pole and getting pelted by a baseballs with a high-speed batting machine. His title is Ultimate Baseball Star (超高校級の「野球選手」, Chō kōkō-kyū no "Yakyū Senshu"; lit. Super High School Level Baseball Player), while his execution is named "The 1.000 Blows".

=== Chihiro Fujisaki ===
Chihiro Fujisaki (不二咲 千尋, Fujisaki Chihiro)
Voiced by (English): Dorothy Elias-Fahn (game); Kara Edwards (anime)
Voiced by (Japanese): Kōki Miyata
A shy, soft-spoken student and a skilled programmer. Chihiro is a boy with a deep insecurity about his weak physique, resorting to cross-dressing to hide his gender. After Monokuma threatens to expose everyone's secrets, Chihiro becomes determined to overcome his own weakness and shares his secret with Mondo. However, this angers Mondo who, in a fit of jealous rage, smashes Chihiro's head in with a dumbbell, making him the second murder victim. Before his death, Chihiro leaves behind a laptop containing the Alter Ego program to help the others, thinking he was not going to survive. His title is Ultimate Programmer (超高校級の「プログラマー」, Chō kōkō-kyū no "Puroguramā"; lit. Super High School Level Programmer). In Danganronpa 2, artificial intelligence programs Usami, Chiaki Nanami and Alter Ego consider Chihiro their "dad".

=== Mondo Owada ===
Mondo Owada (大和田 紋土, Ōwada Mondo)
Voiced by (English): Keith Silverstein (game); Christopher R. Sabat (anime)
Voiced by (Japanese): Kazuya Nakai
A hot-blooded student who is the head of the largest motorcycle gang in the country. He keeps it secret that his older brother died protecting him from getting hit by a truck during a motorcycle race. When Monokuma threatens to reveal this secret, he becomes envious of Chihiro for his true strength and cracks his skull with a dumbbell in a fit of jealous rage, making him the second murderer. He is found guilty and he is executed by being put on a motorcycle and spinning in a cage so fast, he liquifies and turns into butter. His title is Ultimate Biker Gang Leader (超高校級の「暴走族」, Chō kōkō-kyū no "Bōsōzoku"; lit. Super High School Level Biker). His execution is named "The Cage of Death".

=== Kiyotaka Ishimaru ===
Kiyotaka Ishimaru (石丸 清多夏, Ishimaru Kiyotaka)
Voiced by (English): Sean Chiplock (game); Austin Tindle (anime)
Voiced by (Japanese): Kohsuke Toriumi
Nicknamed "Taka" in the English version. An enthusiastically straight-laced student who is a stickler for rules and order and wishes to one day become Prime Minister in order to redeem his family for his grandfather's failures during his time in government. He bonds with Mondo, revering him as his brother, and is traumatized by Mondo's execution. After Alter Ego cheers him up, he takes on Mondo's rude personality, represented by a change in his hair color and combining his name with Mondo's. He is killed by Hifumi under orders from Celeste with a wooden mallet to the head, making him the third murder victim. His title is Ultimate Moral Compass (超高校級の「風紀委員」, Chō kōkō-kyū no "Fūki'īn"; lit. Super High School Level Disciplinarian).

=== Hifumi Yamada ===
Hifumi Yamada (山田 一二三, Yamada Hifumi)
Voiced by (English): Lucien Dodge (game); Tyson Rinehart (anime)
Voiced by (Japanese): Kappei Yamaguchi
An obese otaku student who is a popular doujin manga artist. He proclaims that his interests are "solely in the 2D world", and is known to talk excessively about anime and manga when given the opportunity. After taking a romantic interest in Alter Ego, he is manipulated by Celestia into murdering Kiyotaka with a wooden mallet to the head with the promise of escaping the academy alongside her. However, he is murdered by Celestia in a similar fashion in order to cover her tracks, making him the fourth murder victim. His title is Ultimate Fanfic Creator (超高校級の「同人作家」, Chō kōkō-kyū no "Dōjinsakka"; lit. Super High School Level Dōjin Artist).

=== Celestia Ludenberg ===
Celestia Ludenberg (セレスティア・ルーデンベルク, Seresutia Rūdenberuku)
Voiced by (English): Marieve Herington (game); Lindsay Seidel (anime)
Voiced by (Japanese): Hekiru Shiina
Known as Celeste (セレス, Seresu) for short. A student in Gothic Lolita costume who is a famous gambler and known as the Queen of Liars. She claims to live by the ethic that one must adapt if they want to survive. She is typically calm and collected, but occasionally has outbursts if something annoys her. Appealed by a cash reward for graduating, which she wishes to use to buy a European castle, she manipulates Hifumi into killing Kiyotaka with a wooden mallet to the head, before killing him herself in a similar fashion, hoping to pin the crime on Yasuhiro. She is found guilty when Hifumi's dying words are found to be referring to her real name, Taeko Yasuhiro (安広 多恵子, Yasuhiro Taeko). She is executed by almost being burned at a stake in front of a crowd of Monokumas, before suddenly being run over by a speeding firetruck. Her title is Ultimate Gambler (超高校級の「ギャンブラー」, Chō kōkō-kyū no "Gyanburā"; lit. Super High School Level Gambler). Her execution is named "The Burning of the Versailles Witch".

=== Sakura Ogami ===
Sakura Ogami (大神 さくら, Ōgami Sakura)
Voiced by (English): Jessica Gee-George (game); Rachel Robinson (anime)
Voiced by (Japanese): Kujira
A fearsome yet gentle student, a world-class fighter nicknamed "The Ogre" by Yasuhiro. Despite her long hair and feminine dress style, she is sometimes mistaken for a male due to her muscular build and deep voice. Having been coerced to become a mole for Monokuma due to her family being taken hostage, Sakura commits suicide by ingesting poison in order to protect the others, making her the fifth victim. Her title is Ultimate Martial Artist (超高校級の「格闘家」, Chō kōkō-kyū no "Kakutōka"; lit. Super High School Level Fighter).

=== Junko Enoshima ===
Junko Enoshima (江ノ島 盾子, Enoshima Junko)
Voiced by (English): Amanda Celine Miller/Erin Fitzgerald (game); Jamie Marchi (anime)
Voiced by (Japanese): Megumi Toyoguchi
A charismatic gyaru fashion model who has modeled for many popular magazines. She is thought to have been impaled by several spears as punishment for assaulting Monokuma. The one who was really killed was her twin sister, Mukuro Ikusaba. Junko is actually the mastermind behind the events of the game, who erased the memories of all the students except Mukuro and put them in a death game. Her personality constantly changes as she gets bored easily and thrives to drive people to despair. She is also the cause of the current state of the school and the world, having manipulated and brainwashed the school's disgruntled reserve course students into rioting over their unfair treatment, which the school tried to cover up until it spilled out into the outside world and caused a worldwide uprising against those perceived as special or privileged. When her plans are foiled by Makoto's dedication to never give up hope, she revels in the ultimate form of despair and commits suicide with a combination of the executions she inflicted on the other students. Her body is dismembered by several members of Ultimate Despair and the parts grafted onto their bodies. Her initial title is Ultimate Fashionista (超高校級の「ギャル」, Chō kōkō-kyū no "Gyaru"; lit. Super High School Level Gal), which is replaced by Ultimate Analyst (超高校級の「分析力」, Chō kōkō-kyū no Bunsekiryoku; lit. Super High School Level Analytical Prowess) and Ultimate Despair (超高校級の「絶望」, Chō kōkō-kyū no Zetsubō; lit. Super High School Level Despair), the latter title also referring to the pair's organization. Her execution is named "The Ultimate Punishment".

In Danganronpa 2, an Alter Ego version of Junko, her consciousness having been copied to Monokuma at the moment of her death during the first game, infiltrates the virtual world as a virus, turning what should have been a rehabilitation program into another killing game intended to both provide a physical host for her consciousness and to jog the memories and personalities of the students she was able to manipulate into her nihilistic philosophy. She attempts to get the remaining students to graduate so that her personality can take over the real world bodies of those that died within the virtual world, but she is ultimately thwarted by Hajime Hinata and the other students, being destroyed when the virtual world is shut down. Her avatar appears as a fully three-dimensional giant version possessing a video cell phone that she uses to communicate with the students in the virtual world. She reveals that, after having failed twice, she shows semblance of regret further implied in with her characterization in Danganronpa Zero.

=== Mukuro Ikusaba ===
Mukuro Ikusaba (戦刃 むくろ, Ikusaba Mukuro)
Voiced by (English): Amanda Celine Miller (game); Jamie Marchi (anime)
Voiced by (Japanese): Megumi Toyoguchi
The sixteenth student of Hope's Peak Academy, who the others only become aware of when she is announced as the sixth murder victim. She comes from a mercenary unit known as Fenrir and holds the title Ultimate Soldier (超高校級の「軍人」, Chō kōkō-kyū no "Gunjin"; lit. Super High School Level Soldier). Mukuro is Junko's twin sister and is disguised as Junko during the killing game under the guise of Ultimate Fashionista (超高校級の「ギャル」, Chō kōkō-kyū no "Gyaru"; lit. Super High School Level Gal). However, Junko became bored with the original plan and killed Mukuro on a whim. In the alternative story depicted in the Danganronpa IF digital novel included with Danganronpa 2, Mukuro is saved from being killed by Junko thanks to Makoto and decides to turn against Junko and help everyone escape from the academy alive once she realizes that Junko is beyond saving. During the novel, it is revealed that Mukuro does not share Junko's nihilist philosophy and only involved herself with Ultimate Despair because she loved Junko too much to abandon her. She also has a crush on Makoto, since he was not intimidated by her military background and talked to her like a normal person. In Danganronpa 3, we do see when she was still loyal to Junko willingly following orders
In Killer Killer, Mukuro is apparently revealed to be alive and a prisoner of the Future Foundation, but this is only a fake from an army of Mukuros made by the main antagonist. Several years before "The Tragedy" takes place, Mukuro is also revealed to have massacred everyone within a middle school but for two young boys hiding in a pair of lockers, who grow up to become the vigilante serial killers known as "Killer Killer", the former having at that moment fallen in love with Mukuro from the incident at the beauty of her killings, killing any whose killings he believes to have been perpetrated without proper motivation, and the later growing to hate all killers in general regardless of motivation.

=== Alter Ego ===
Alter Ego (アルターエゴ, Arutā Ego)
Voiced by (English): Dorothy Elias-Fahn (game); Kara Edwards (anime)
Voiced by (Japanese): Kōki Miyata
An artificial intelligence program left behind by Chihiro following his death. He generally speaks with Chihiro's voice and likeness, but can also imitate other students. After the others discover him on a laptop Chihiro fixed, he decrypts some data on the laptop to help the other students and is treated as a friend. Alter Ego asks Makoto and Kyoko to help connect him to the school network so he can find out more, but he is discovered by Monokuma and destroyed by a bulldozer following the fourth trial. However, he leaves behind a virus in the network which saves Makoto when Monokuma attempts to execute him. In Danganronpa 2, a reconstructed Alter Ego appears within the Neo World Program as its Master Program before being restricted by a virus brought by Izuru Kamukura: Junko Enoshima is revealed to have used Alter Ego offscreen during the events of the first game to transfer her consciousness into Monokuma at the moment of her death, becoming an A.I. herself. His execution is named "Excavator Destroyer" (serving as a replacement for Sakura Ogami).

=== Jin Kirigiri ===
Jin Kirigiri (霧切 仁, Kirigiri Jin)
Voiced by (English): Keith Silverstein (game) J. Michael Tatum (anime)
Voiced by (Japanese): Kappei Yamaguchi (game), Rikiya Koyama (anime)
The principal of Hope's Peak Academy and Kyoko's father who did not spend much time with her in her youth. When Junko executes her plan to bring the world to despair, he tries to protect the students by locking them in the academy. However, he is captured by Junko and killed by being sent up in a rocket. He is discovered by Makoto and Kyoko when they find his skeletal remains inside a gift box. His execution is named "Blast Off!". In Danganronpa Zero and Danganronpa 2, Jin is revealed to have been one of the creators of Izuru Kamukura.

== Danganronpa 2: Goodbye Despair ==
=== Hajime Hinata ===
Hajime Hinata (日向 創, Hinata Hajime) / Izuru Kamukura (神座 出流, Kamukura Izuru)

Voiced by (English): Johnny Yong Bosch
Voiced by (Japanese): Minami Takayama

The protagonist of the second game, an amnesiac boy with a deep admiration for Hope's Peak Academy. Over the course of the Killing School Trip, he discovers that he is in fact a member of Hope's Peak's Reserve Course Department and has no ultimate talent. Driven by his desire for talent, Hajime agreed to take part in the Izuru Kamukura project and was surgically implanted with every talent known to man, lobotomizing him in the process. Reborn as Izuru Kamukura, he brought Alter Ego Junko into the Neo World Program in order to pit hope against despair and see who would triumph. Coming to terms with his past with the aid of Makoto Naegi, Hajime rallies the remaining students to defeat Alter Ego Junko and becomes one of the survivors who manages to escape to the real world. He returns in Danganronpa 3: The End of Hope's Peak High School, where he has retained Izuru's talent and Hajime's personality. After reviving the students who were killed in the Neo World Program during the Killing School Trip, he leads them in battle to stop the unhinged Mitarai from using his hope video on humanity. Afterwards, the 77th Class scapegoats themselves for the Final Killing Game in order to protect the Future Foundation's reputation and exiles themselves to the real Jabberwock Island along with a repentant Mitarai.

Izuru first appears in the light novel Danganronpa Zero as detective Kyoko Kirigiri investigates him. Izuru is described as a student of indeterminate gender hiding on the grounds of the school, and the perpetrator of "The Tragedy", an event involving mass murder that resulted in the decay of mankind. Izuru's identity is also briefly adopted by Yasuke Matsuda in snapping Yuto Kamishiro's neck.

=== Chiaki Nanami ===
Chiaki Nanami (七海 千秋, Nanami Chiaki)
Voiced by (English): Christine Marie Cabanos
Voiced by (Japanese): Kana Hanazawa
She is a sleepy, laid-back student who is inexperienced in the ways of the world, but very skilled at video games. Along with Hajime, she becomes a central figure of the trials. She accidentally kills Nagito, falling into his trap which was meant to ensure her survival alone, but she thwarts his plans by confessing her identity and offering herself to be executed by getting crushed by a Tetris block in order to save the remaining students. It is learned during the graduation that she is actually an AI program created by the late Chihiro Fujisaki designed to observe and protect the students during the Future Foundation's experiment. However, some of her consciousness remains, allowing her to help Hajime Hinata° during his conflict. Her title is Ultimate Gamer (超高校級の「ゲーマー」, Chō kōkō-kyū no "Gēmā"; lit. Super High School Level Gamer). Her execution is named "Please Insert Coin".

In Danganronpa 3, it is revealed that the Chiaki Nanami computer program was based on an actual student who attended Hope's Peak Academy along with the rest of the 77th class of Hope's Peak, the true Ultimate Gamer (超高校級の「ゲーマー」, Chō kōkō-kyū no "Gēmā"; lit. Super High School Level Gamer). Chiaki quickly befriended Hajime before becoming Izuru and was unanimously elected class representative after bringing video games to the class to help everyone bond. However, it was because of these traits that she was chosen to be executed by Junko in order to drive the rest of her class into becoming Remnants of Despair, forced to go through a dungeon filled with deadly traps before being skewered to death. Recognizing hope as an equal force to despair upon witnessing her death, Izuru decides to take on a neutral role in the coming war. Chiaki is the only student of Class 77-B who stays dead permanently, as she was physically killed by Junko, compared to the other victims who died within the simulation, fell into comas, and were subsequently revived by Hajime. The ending of Danganronpa 3 shows Izuru finally bidding farewell to the memory of both Chiakis, as he embraces and chases his own future by joining Nagito and his other classmates.

=== Nagito Komaeda ===
Nagito Komaeda (狛枝 凪斗, Komaeda Nagito) / The Servant (召使い, Meshitsukai)

Voiced by (English): Bryce Papenbrook
Voiced by (Japanese): Megumi Ogata
Nagito is a deliberate foil to the previous protagonist, Makoto. Like Makoto, Nagito is an optimistic, subservient student who was accepted to the academy by raffle and received the title of Ultimate Lucky Student (超高校級の「幸運」, Chō kōkō-kyū no "Kōun"; lit. Super High School Level Good Luck). Unlike Makoto, his title is more literal, as he experiences an extraordinary cycle of good and bad luck that ultimately works to his benefit when good or causes some sort of harm to him when bad. Initially thought to be a friendly, upbeat, somewhat meek young man, he is shown to be quite deranged in his pursuit of hope, believing it to be an absolute good that only his talented classmates can achieve. Because of his beliefs, he is completely willing to let his talented classmates walk over him, for he sees himself as inferior to them, all while keeping his cheerful, optimistic attitude and frequently referring to himself as a "stepping stone for [their] hope." He is the sixth and final murder victim, orchestrating an elaborate death trap to trick the Future Foundation traitor into throwing a canister of poison at him and becoming his killer. He appears in future installments, including Danganronpa Another Episode: Ultra Despair Girls as "The Servant" who wishes to turn its protagonist, Komaru Naegi, into Ultimate Despair, and in the anime series, where it shows him both before and after the events of Danganronpa 2.

Nagito was created to be "an absolute rival" to Hajime Hinata, with Kazutaka Kodaka describing their relationship as similar to that of the Joker to Batman. Komaeda's characterization was aimed to give players a confusing view in regards to Nagito's true self, based on the morally dubious and contradictory actions he committed over the course of the game. In regards to his design, Hajime was the earliest-designed character which generated a major contrast between his white clothing to Nagito's dark clothing. Nagito was written to create a major impact into the game despite not being the lead or antagonist, symbolizing the prominent themes of hope and despair through his actions.

To surprise gamers and suggest the characters are potentially the same person, both Makoto and Nagito share the same voice actress, Ogata. His name, "Nagito Komaeda", was conceived as an anagram for "Naegi Makoto da" ("I am Makoto Naegi") to infer it as a potential pseudonym; Nagito claims the name to be an alias during the third chapter. In 2020, Kodaka revealed the anagram was used to engage fans of Danganronpa: Trigger Happy Havoc because of the lack of pre-release promotion materials for the original version of Goodbye Despair during its release year. This surprised Ogata, as the anagram had been kept secret from the other members who developed the game, including Ogata herself. In 2015, it was later confirmed that he had feelings for an ambiguous "him" in his character song "Poison -Gekiyaku-".

In the development of anime prequel Danganronpa 3: The End of Hope's Peak High School, Kodaka aimed to write the younger Nagito as an unpredictable character that game fans would still recognize, and make it obvious his good luck often aids him in only a random nature in reality compared to the specific nature of the Neo World Program. His character design was aimed to keep the "resembled flickering flames" present in their Servant design, something Kodaka requested to the designer to adapt properly. Kodaka was pleased with how Nagito was written in the anime, further comparing his school life and luck to the Rube Goldberg segment of the PythagoraSwitch educational television program. Localization member Robert Schiotis felt that finding a voice actor for the latter proved too challenging, as he is meant to clash with Makoto's ideals. In the end, Papenbrook voiced both characters, making the connections between them more interesting according to localization staff.

Nagito has been a popular character, ranking highly on multiple polls. Anime News Network praised the character for "standing out" within the franchise, highlighting his similarities with Makoto and how different they are the same time. The reviewer enjoyed the actions the character has performed not only in the game but also the Despair Arc anime from the franchise as despite his kind demeanor, his commentaries make Hajime become corrupted across the narrative. GameRevolution also referred to Nagito as one of the best Danganronpa characters due to his twisted characterization yet highly popular.

=== Fuyuhiko Kuzuryu ===
Fuyuhiko Kuzuryu (九頭龍 冬彦, Kuzuryū Fuyuhiko)
Voiced by (English): Derek Stephen Prince (game); Aaron Dismuke (anime)
Voiced by (Japanese): Daisuke Kishio
A wary student who is the successor of the largest yakuza family in Japan. He threatens violence to anyone who mentions his babyish face. He meets with Mahiru after learning of her involvement in his sister's death, but becomes enraged and nearly kills her when she calls him out for the murder of her friend, Sato, the girl who killed his sister, which the academy had covered up to preserve its reputation. Peko suddenly steps in and kills Mahiru herself, planning to claim he ordered her to do so to get him off the island. When Peko is found guilty, he tries to protect her but is severely beaten and loses an eye after Peko accidentally cuts him with her blade, subsequently using her own body to shield his. He becomes humbled by the experience, becoming a far more level headed and reliable member of the group, who tries to atone for both Peko and Mahiru's deaths even attempting suicide to show Hiyoko how sorry he was about Mahiru and is one of the surviving students who manage to escape to the real world. His title is Ultimate Yakuza (超高校級の「極道」, Chō kōkō-kyū no "Gokudō"; lit. Super High School Level Gangster).

=== Akane Owari ===
Akane Owari (終里 赤音, Owari Akane)
Voiced by (English): Wendee Lee (game); Morgan Garrett (anime)
Voiced by (Japanese): Romi Park
A dimwitted, athletic student who specializes in gymnastics and greatly enjoys food. Having come from a rough neighborhood and home life has made her exceedingly blunt and confrontational. She forms a close bond with Nekomaru. She is one of the survivors who manages to escape to the real world. Her title is Ultimate Gymnast (超高校級の「体操選手」, Chō kōkō-kyū no "Taisō senshu"; lit. Super High School Level Gymnast).

=== Sonia Nevermind ===
Sonia Nevermind (ソニア・ネヴァーマインド, Sonia Nevāmaindo)
Voiced by (English): Natalie Hoover
Voiced by (Japanese): Miho Arakawa
A noble student from overseas who is the princess of Novoselic, a small European monarchy that imports large amounts of Japanese media, leading Sonia to become fascinated with Japan and thus deciding to attend Hope's Peak Academy. Generally demure and elegant, she also possesses some odd quirks such as a penchant for profanity in her native language during tense moments and has an excessive love of pop culture, especially horror movies. She is also a fan of serial killers due to their warped pathological behaviors. She is one of the survivors who manage to escape to the real world. Her title is Ultimate Princess (超高校級の「王女」, Chō kōkō-kyū no "Ōjo"; lit. Super High School Level Princess). In Danganronpa: Togami, she is depicted as the secondary antagonist after usurping the Novoselic throne and massacring the Council of Global Controllers, alongside hundreds of citizens of Prague.

=== Kazuichi Soda ===
Kazuichi Soda (左右田 和一, Sōda Kazuichi)
Voiced by (English): Kyle Hebert
Voiced by (Japanese): Yoshimasa Hosoya
A flashy but cowardly student who is skilled with mechanics and has a tendency to overreact. Once a meek and bullied student, Kazuichi completely changed his appearance once he was accepted to Hope's Peak academy in order to turn a new leaf. He has a crush on Sonia Nevermind, but it is generally unrequited. He is one of the survivors that manages to escape to the real world. He is later discovered to have been the one to build the Monokuma robots. His title is Ultimate Mechanic (超高校級の「メカニック」, Chō kōkō-kyū no "Mekanikku"; lit. Super High School Level Mechanic). In Danganronpa Togami, he is depicted as a secondary antagonist and Novoselic Minister of Defense, in the service of Queen Sonia Nevermind.

=== Ultimate Imposter ===
Ultimate Imposter (超高校級の「詐欺師」, Chō kōkō-kyū no "Sagishi"; lit. Super High School Level Imposter)
Voiced by (English): Jason Wishnov (Byakuya disguise; game); Jessie James Grelle (Byakuya disguise; anime); Justin Briner (Ryota disguise; anime); Eric Vale (actual self; anime)
Voiced by (Japanese): Akira Ishida (Byakuya disguise and actual self); Kanata Hongō (Ryota disguise)
A mysterious person whose real name, along with any other information besides his Ultimate title, is unknown. The Ultimate Imposter has the ability to impersonate any other student, including their voice, personality, and talent, with the only notable difference from the original being an overweight appearance and an obsession with eating. In Danganronpa 2, he impersonates Byakuya Togami, appointing himself as the group's de facto leader, proclaiming that no one will be killed while under his watch. He is the first to be murdered after being inadvertently stabbed by Teruteru, who was trying to murder Nagito, with a kabob stick. In Danganronpa 3: Despair Arc, he impersonates Ryota so the latter can stay at home to work on his anime. The Despair Arc also reveals the Imposter's true appearance: long black hair and gray eyes.
In the second volume of Danganronpa: Togami, the true identity of the Ultimate Imposter is implied to be that of Kazuya Togami (十神 数や, Tōgami Kazuya), Byakuya's adoptive half-brother, who hijacks their father's tournament for the title of Ultimate Affluent Progeny by killing him and several of their siblings. but this is later revealed to be not the case. In the first and third volumes, set during the events before "The Tragedy", the Ultimate Imposter impersonates Byakuya in taking control of the Togami Conglomerate and sending out a "World Domination Proclamation" announcing the end of the world less he (Byakuya) be assassinated within the following 24 hours, at which point the perpetrator would receive total control over the assets of the Togami Conglomerate.

=== Teruteru Hanamura ===
Teruteru Hanamura (花村 輝々, Hanamura Teruteru)
Voiced by (English): Todd Haberkorn
Voiced by (Japanese): Jun Fukuyama
A diminutive student who is known for his culinary skills and inappropriate remarks, and is a bisexual pervert. He often claims to be an urban chef but is in fact from a highly rural area of Japan where his mother and his siblings (candidates for the title of Ultimate Escort) ran a restaurant, which he wanted to help save by finding success. He finds out about Nagito's plot to murder and tries to prevent the plot by killing Nagito first but inadvertently ends up killing Byakuya instead. Teruteru feigned disbelief at the situation but was actually the most worried, as his concern for his dying mother and her poor health drove him to panic. He is executed by being coated in eggs and breadcrumbs, and then deep-fried in a volcano. His title is Ultimate Cook (超高校級の「料理人」, Chō kōkō-kyū no "Ryōrinin"; lit. Super High School Level Cook), but prefers to be called the Ultimate Chef (超高校級の「シェフ」, Chō kōkō-kyū no "Shefu"; lit. Super High School Level Chef), claiming it sounds more sophisticated. His execution is named "Deep Fried Teruteru".

=== Mahiru Koizumi ===
Mahiru Koizumi (小泉 真昼, Koizumi Mahiru)
Voiced by (English): Carrie Keranen
Voiced by (Japanese): Yū Kobayashi
A strong-minded, common-sensed girl who is good at taking portrait photographs and has ill feelings towards men. She is the second murder victim, killed by a blow to the head with a baseball bat by Peko, who jumped in to do the deed to stop an enraged Fuyuhiko from doing so after he finds out she was involved in his sister's death, albeit indirectly, and had tried to cover up the killer's actions after the fact before Fuyuhiko himself had killed her. Her title is Ultimate Photographer (超高校級の「写真家」, Chō kōkō-kyū no "Shashinka"; lit. Super High School Level Photographer).

=== Peko Pekoyama ===
Peko Pekoyama (辺古山 ペコ, Pekoyama Peko)
Voiced by (English): Clarine Harp (anime)
Voiced by (Japanese): Kotono Mitsuishi
An emotionless and observant student who is a master of kendo and always carries a wooden sword. She is also a servant of the Kuzuryu family and a childhood friend of Fuyuhiko. She murders Mahiru with a baseball bat, doing so to stop an enraged Fuyuhiko from committing the crime and also pave the way for him to escape. Believing herself to be a mere tool to be used as Fuyuhiko sees fit, Peko tries to convince Monokuma that he is the killer and the others had in fact voted incorrectly. Monokuma takes Peko's claim into consideration, but due to Fuyuhiko's true feelings, it's decided that Peko is not a tool in Fuyuhiko's eyes, but instead, a person in her own right, therefore making her the blackened. She is executed after losing a fight against an army of sword-wielding soldiers. Fuyuhiko attempts to save her by interrupting her execution, but gets injured by Peko in the process. Her title is Ultimate Swordswoman (超高校級の「剣道家」, Chō kōkō-kyū no "Kendōka"; lit. Super High School Level Kendo Practitioner). Her execution is named "One Woman Army".

=== Ibuki Mioda ===
Ibuki Mioda (澪田 唯吹, Mioda Ibuki)
Voiced by (English): Julie Ann Taylor (game)Brina Palencia (anime)
Voiced by (Japanese): Ami Koshimizu
An outgoing, energetic student who is a guitar member of a popular all-female band and has a sensitive sense of hearing. Her current music is implied to be an acquired taste, showcasing elements of screamo music. She is the third murder victim, having been strangled to death and then hung on a noose by Mikan. Her title is Ultimate Musician (超高校級の「軽音楽部」, Chō kōkō-kyū no "Keiongaku-bu"; lit. Super High School Level Light Music Club Member).

=== Hiyoko Saionji ===
Hiyoko Saionji (西園寺 日寄子, Saionji Hiyoko)
Voiced by (English): Kira Buckland
Voiced by (Japanese): Suzuko Mimori
A cute, yet malicious and selfish student who is a popular performer of nihon-buyō dance. She has a generally cheeky personality but will often show harshness towards the other students, most notably Mikan. She grows a close bond with Mahiru and is devastated by her death, and holds thinly veiled contempt for Fuyuhiko for a while. She is the fourth murder victim, having her throat slit by Mikan after she accidentally stumbled upon her killing Ibuki. Her title is Ultimate Traditional Dancer (超高校級の「日本舞踊家」, Chō kōkō-kyū no "Nihon buyōka"; lit. Super High School Level Japanese Dancer).

=== Mikan Tsumiki ===
Mikan Tsumiki (罪木 蜜柑, Tsumiki Mikan)
Voiced by (English): Stephanie Sheh
Voiced by (Japanese): Ai Kayano
An anxious but devoted nursing student who is easily intimidated, often to tears. She once suffered cruelty and an extremely abusive childhood, and still takes a servile attitude. A common running gag with her is her clumsiness, as she often falls into physic-defying, compromising positions. She gets infected with the "Despair Disease", a pathogen created by Monokuma to drive the students into paranoia and irritability and which evolves into a different disease for each student. In Mikan's case, it became the "Remembering Disease," causing her original persona as one of Junko's minions and would-be lover to resurface. Hoping to impress Junko and eventually rejoin her, she murders Ibuki by strangulation and Hiyoko by a slit to the throat. She is executed by being launched into space on a large steroid-injected arm. Her title is Ultimate Nurse (超高校級の「保健委員」, Chō kōkō-kyū no "Hoken'īn"; lit. Super High School Level Health Committee Member). Her execution is named "Bye Bye Ouchies".

=== Nekomaru Nidai ===
Nekomaru Nidai (弐大 猫丸, Nidai Nekomaru)
Voiced by (English): Patrick Seitz
Voiced by (Japanese): Hiroki Yasumoto
A sturdy, outspoken student who is passionate about supporting athletes but suffers from dyspepsia. After being gravely wounded by Monokuma while protecting Akane from one of Monokuma's attacks, he is rebuilt into a cyborg known as Mechamaru. Shortly afterward, he is killed by Gundham after falling to his death, becoming the fifth murder victim. Following his death, some of his remaining parts are rebuilt by Kazuichi into Minimaru, a vibrating alarm clock, which is given to Akane and displays limited sentience. His title is Ultimate Team Manager (超高校級の「マネージャー」, Chō kōkō-kyū no "Manējā"; lit. Super High School Level Coach).

=== Gundham Tanaka ===
Gundham Tanaka (田中 眼蛇夢, Tanaka Gandamu) / Tanaka the Forbidden One (封印されし 田中, Fūinsareshi Tanaka)
Voiced by (English): Chris Tergliafera (game); Scott Frerichs (anime)
Voiced by (Japanese): Tomokazu Sugita
A cryptic, assertive student who excels at animal husbandry. He is dramatic in appearance and manner, but fiercely protective of animals, particularly his own pet hamsters: San-D, Jum-P, Maga-Z, and Cham-P, which he collectively calls the Four Dark Devas of Destruction (破壊神暗黒四天王, Hakai-shin Ankoku Shiten'nō). He murders Nekomaru after being forced to choose between murder or starvation and is executed by being trampled to death by a stampede of animals. It is shown in a flashback that both he and Nekomaru understood that if one of them did not kill the other, there was a good chance all the students would remain trapped and starve to death, and thus they engaged in honorable hand-to-hand combat, with Gundham emerging victorious with the help of his hamsters. His title is Ultimate Breeder (超高校級の「飼育委員」, Chō kōkō-kyū no "Shīkuīn"; lit. Super High School Level Animal Breeder). His execution is named "Gundham Tanaka Stampede".

=== Usami / Monomi ===
Usami (ウサミ) / Monomi (モノミ)
Voiced by (English): Rebecca Forstadt (game); Anastasia Muñoz (anime)
Voiced by (Japanese): Takako Sasuga
Also known by her full name Magical Girl Miracle Usami, Usami is a strange stuffed rabbit who proclaims herself to be the academy's teacher and oversee the school trip on the island. Like Monokuma, who seems to have the ability to teleport, Usami has magical powers which she can use to kill monsters or turn chickens into cows. After taking over the school trip, Monokuma refits Usami with a pink monochrome appearance and forcefully changes her name to Monomi. Her favorite catchphrase is "love, love." Despite being usurped by Monokuma, she still does what she can to help the students. It is later revealed that her true purpose was to serve as a monitor for the students' rehabilitation, working alongside Chiaki. She is executed alongside Chiaki in the execution "Please Insert Coin" when all of her backup bodies are destroyed, but she reappears to destroy Alter Ego Junko when the virtual world is shut down. She later appears in the 'Future Arc' of Danganronpa 3 as a program on Miaya's computer, which is also converted by Monokuma into Monomi. Usami also appears in the Vita version of the first game as part of the School Mode.

=== Natsumi Kuzuryu ===
Natsumi Kuzuryu (九頭龍 菜摘, Kuzuryū Natsumi)
Voiced by (English): Apphia Yu
Voiced by (Japanese): Haruka Yamazaki
Fuyuhiko's younger sister who was a transfer student in Hajime's Reserve Class, wanting to one day obtain a talent so she could stand alongside her brother. She was killed by being repeatedly hit over the head with a swimsuit filled with pebbles by Sato.

=== Sato ===
Sato (サトウ, Satō)
Voiced by (English): Luci Christian
Voiced by (Japanese): Ai Shimizu
A student of the Reserve Class who was close friends with Mahiru, Mikan, Hiyoko, and Ibuki. She killed Natsumi, believing that she would try to harm Mahiru, before being slowly beaten to death with a metallic baseball bat by Fuyuhiko.

== Danganronpa Another Episode: Ultra Despair Girls ==
=== Komaru Naegi ===
Komaru Naegi (苗木 こまる, Naegi Komaru)
Voiced by (English): Cherami Leigh (games, since Another Episode); Alexis Tipton (anime)
Voiced by (Japanese): Aya Uchida (since Another Episode)
The protagonist of Danganronpa Another Episode, and Makoto's younger sister. She appears briefly and unnamed in the first game (only being referred to as "Makoto's Sister" (ナエギ・イモウト, Naegi Imōto)) during Makoto's motivational DVD, in which she and her parents end up in an unknown disaster. In Danganronpa Another Episode, which takes place half a year after the events of the first game, it is revealed that Komaru had been locked up inside an apartment complex in Towa City, unaware of what had occurred in the outside world. When a Monokuma robot attacks her, she is given a Hacking Gun by Byakuya and attempts to flee the city with the Future Foundation. However, she is caught by the Warriors of Hope and is forced to play in their Demon Hunting game, meeting up with Toko along the way. After facing countless trials, growing stronger as a person, it is eventually revealed that the purpose of her trials were part of Monaca's plan to mold her into becoming Junko's successor. However, with the support of Toko, Komaru regains her hope, ultimately deciding to stay in Towa City to help its citizens. She later reappears in Danganronpa 3, once again working with Toko to stop Monaca. As she has no particularly outstanding qualities, she is given the title of "Ordinary Girl with an Ultimate Big Brother" (超高校級の兄を持つ"ふつうの少女", Chō kōkō-kyū no Ani o Motsu "Futsū no Shōjo").

=== Warriors of Hope ===
Warriors of Hope (希望の戦士, Kibō no Senshi)
A group of five RPG fanatic elementary school children from Hope's Peak Academy's elementary school branch, built to monitor potential child prodigies, with the Warriors being considered on par with Ultimate students in terms of sheer talent. The Warriors of Hope were all abused children who made a suicide pact. Just as they were about to go through with killing themselves, they were stopped by Junko Enoshima, leading them to idolize her. Junko, on a whim, manipulated the children's emotions and ultimately turned them evil. The Warriors control the Monokuma robots attacking the city. Their plan is to take over the world by murdering all the adults who they call "Demons" and create a paradise for children. Their titles are based on elementary school subjects. By the end of the game, the Warriors of Hope realize that they were being manipulated by Junko and Monaca, and ultimately decide to try and redeem themselves for what they have done.

==== Monaca Towa ====
Monaca Towa (塔和 最中 (モナカ), Tōwa Monaka)
Voiced by (English): Cristina Vee
Voiced by (Japanese): Aya Hirano
The Mage (魔法使い, Mahōtsukai) of the Warriors of Hope who is "restricted" to a wheelchair. While apparently polite and cutesy, she is actually an amoral, sociopathic manipulator who does not hesitate to resort to triggering the mental issues of the other Warriors of Hope to get them in line, even resorting to borderline sexual extortion of Nagisa at one point. She is the more substantial leader of the group, as the others will often bow to her whims to keep her emotions under control. She is later revealed to be Haiji's younger half-sister, who had been faking her own disability so that people would pity her and used the Towa Group to create the Monokuma robots. Her true intention was not to build a paradise for children, but instead to spark a war between Towa City and the Future Foundation and turn Komaru into the successor of Junko. Following her defeat, she is rescued by Nagito, who inspires her to become the next Junko. She reappears in Danganronpa 3, killing Miaya Gekkogahara and replacing her with a robot that she controls. After being confronted by Komaru and Fukawa again, Monaca reveals that having to deal with Nagito had completely put her off despair and soured her image of Junko to the point that she no longer wanted anything to do with the title of Ultimate Despair. She ultimately decides to become a NEET instead, blasting herself into space, but not before revealing that she was not the mastermind of the final killing game, but merely a third party. Her former title is Li'l Ultimate Homeroom (超小学生級の学活の時間, Chō Shōgakusei-kyū no Gakukatsu no Jikan; lit. Super Elementary School Level Homeroom).

==== Masaru Daimon ====
Masaru Daimon (大門 大, Daimon Masaru)
Voiced by (English): Tara Sands
Voiced by (Japanese): Megumi Han
The self-proclaimed leader of the Warriors of Hope. Masaru is the Hero (勇者, Yūsha) of the group, who wears an outfit typical of a young hero protagonist character. He is passionate about creating a safe haven for children after facing abuse from his alcoholic father. He is defeated by Komaru and Toko and is punished by the Monokuma Kids. He reappears in Danganronpa 3 as one of Komaru's allies. His title is Li'l Ultimate P.E. (超小学生級の体育の時間, Chō Shōgakusei-kyū no Taiiku no Jikan; lit. Super Elementary School Level Athletics).

==== Jataro Kerumi ====
Jataro Kemuri (煙 蛇太郎, Kemuri Jatarō)
Voiced by (English): Michelle Ruff
Voiced by (Japanese): Sumire Uesaka
The Priest (僧侶, Sōryo) of the Warriors of Hope who wears a mask covering his face, which is actually a cute child-like face. His parents often felt intimidated by how beautiful he was and coped by emotionally abusing him. He has a creepy personality, never sure if people hate him or if he wants people to hate him, and prone to bizarre, off-topic rambling about strange topics which he says that he is not fully aware of, comparing it to yawning. He is defeated by Komaru and Toko and subsequently punished by the Monokuma Kids. He reappears in Danganronpa 3 as one of Komaru's allies. His title is Li'l Ultimate Art (超小学生級の図工の時間, Chō Shōgakusei-kyū no Zukō no Jikan; lit. Super Elementary School Level Arts and Crafts).

==== Kotoko Utsugi ====
Kotoko Utsugi (空木 言子, Utsugi Kotoko)
Voiced by (English): Erica Lindbeck
Voiced by (Japanese): Kazusa Aranami
The Fighter (戦士, Senshi) of the Warriors of Hope, who dresses in sweet lolita fashion and wears a pair of horns. She is a child actress with a traumatic history of sexual abuse, causing her to tense up whenever she hears the word "gentle." Her mother would prostitute her to men in the entertainment industry to improve her prospects and would often join her as a twisted form of parent-child bonding; her father, meanwhile, was having an affair with his dental hygienist. She is defeated by Komaru and Toko but is spared from her punishment thanks to Genocide Jack. She later learns the true nature of Monaca's plans and turns against her. She is later seen fighting the Monokuma Kids alongside the other Warriors of Hope. She reappears in Danganronpa 3 as one of Komaru's allies. Her title is Li'l Ultimate Drama (超小学生級の学芸会の時間, Chō Shōgakusei-kyū no Gakugei-kai no Jikan; lit. Super Elementary School Level School Play).

==== Nagisa Shingetsu ====
Nagisa Shingetsu (新月 渚, Shingetsu Nagisa)
Voiced by (English): Erica Mendez
Voiced by (Japanese): Mariya Ise
Vice-leader of the Warriors of Hope and the Sage (賢者, Kenja) of the group who often keeps a cool composure. He is quite intellectual, largely due to the pressure forced upon him by his parents to study, injecting him with drugs and hooking him to intravenous drips to keep him awake to study. He becomes the leader following Masaru's defeat and attempts to lead Komaru out of the city to stop her interfering with their plans, only to learn from Nagito about Monaca's true intentions. He is then swayed by Monaca to go against Komaru again and is subsequently defeated. He reappears in Danganronpa 3 as one of Komaru's allies. He owns the title of Li'l Ultimate Social Studies (超小学生級の社会の時間, Chō Shōgakusei-kyū no Shakai no jikan; lit. Super Elementary School Level Social Studies).

=== Shirokuma and Kurokuma ===
Shirokuma (シロクマ; lit. White Bear) and Kurokuma (クロクマ; lit. Black Bear)

Voiced by (English): Amanda Celine Miller (Shirokuma); Erin Fitzgerald (Kurokuma)
Voiced by (Japanese): Megumi Toyoguchi

Two variants of Monokuma that have built-in artificial intelligence, and serve as the antagonists of Danganronpa Another Episode. Shirokuma appears to be a shy white bear who helps out the resistance, sporting an idol-like personality and showing a dislike for people getting into fights. Kurokuma, on the other hand, is a black bear who serves as an advisor to the Warriors of Hope, sporting a gangster-like personality and being way too talkative to the point of annoyance. However they are actually the true masterminds behind the war between children and adults, who had been manipulating the two sides to get the Future Foundation involved and fill Towa City with despair. At the end of the game, they are both revealed to be under the control of Alter Ego Junko, who had been manipulating Monaca Towa to further her own plans. Both Shirokuma and Kurokuma are destroyed by Izuru when their ceaseless talking irritates him. He then smuggles the pieces containing Alter Ego Junko to Jabberwock Island as part of his plan to permanently destroy Junko.

=== Haiji Towa ===
Haiji Towa (塔和 灰慈, Tōwa Haiji)
Voiced by (English): Matthew Mercer
Voiced by (Japanese): Shin-ichiro Miki
The leader of a resistance group battling against the Warriors of Hope. Despite his alliance with the forces attempting to keep order and survive, he is a coward who is profoundly self-interested, growing upset when others call him out for his hypocrisy in claiming to be a general for the adults but hiding so much he renders the resistance ineffective. He has a strong fear of the Future Foundation, as he does not want them to find out that his father's company built the Monokuma robots. He is Monaca's older half-brother. After witnessing the true scale of Monaca's plot, as well as Komaru's refusal to kill the Monokuma Kids, Haiji loses all desire for revenge against Monaca and continues to lead the resistance against the Monokuma robots.

=== Yuta Asahina ===
Yuta Asahina (朝日奈 悠太, Asahina Yūta)
Voiced by (English): Michelle Ruff
Voiced by (Japanese): Tōko Aoyama
Aoi Asahina's younger brother, a young athletic boy who is caught up in the Demon Hunting game. He attempts to swim out of the city but is killed when his bracelet explodes after going out of range.

=== Hiroko Hagakure ===
Hiroko Hagakure (葉隠 浩子, Hagakure Hiroko)
Voiced by (English): Jessica Straus
Voiced by (Japanese): Chihiro Ishiguro
Yasuhiro Hagakure's mother, a pink-haired woman who is both a member of the resistance and one of the targets in Demon Hunting. She uses information gathered by Komaru to help rescue other captives.

=== Taichi Fujisaki ===
Taichi Fujisaki (不二咲 太市, Fujisaki Taichi)
Voiced by: Kōki Miyata
Chihiro Fujisaki's father, a middle-aged man who is skilled with hacking systems. He helps Komaru and Toko progress through Towa Tower but is subsequently attacked and presumably killed by a Beast Monokuma. However, if the player returns to the location later, Taichi's body is not there, and a note written by him is in its place. Taichi's note states a refusal to die until he sees his wife and son safe again, implying he survived not only the attack Komaru thought killed him, but the game as a whole, although unaware of his son already being dead.

=== Tokuichi Towa ===
Tokuichi Towa (塔和 十九一, Tōwa Tokuichi)
Voiced by: Junpei Asahina
The head of the Towa Group and father of Haiji and Monaca. He was killed by Monaca, but somehow his spirit manages to briefly possess Komaru, begging her to put a stop to Monaca's plans.

=== Monokuma Kids ===
Monokuma Kids (モノクマキッズ, Monokuma Kidzu)
A group of children wearing Monokuma masks who work alongside the Monokuma robots. Their motives are a mystery, as they seem to both hinder and assist the protagonists, as well as punish the Warriors of Hope if they fail. It is later revealed that the masks they wear, which brainwash them into killing adults, contain explosives which would set off if the controller for the Monokuma robots were to be broken.

=== Kanon Nakajima ===
Kanon Nakajima (仲島 花音, Nakajima Kanon)
Leon Kuwata's cousin who appears in the Ultra Despair Hagakure mini novel included in Danganronpa Another Episode. She is madly in love with Leon, but he always saw her as a little sister. She gained insane levels of physical strength after Leon, wanting to give her a goal, told her that he would date her if she threw a 160km/h fastball, leading her to practice and train day and night. She becomes Leon's motive in the first game, hoping that once he escapes, he would go try to find Kanon and see if she survived the Tragedy. After learning of Leon's death, Kanon comes to blame the Future Foundation. She plots to kill Yasuhiro when she encounters him in Towa City, but changes her mind after he saves her from Kotoko.

== Danganronpa 3: The End of Hope's Peak High School ==
=== Kyosuke Munakata ===
Kyosuke Munakata (宗方 京助, Munakata Kyōsuke)
Voiced by (English): Ricco Fajardo
Voiced by (Japanese): Toshiyuki Morikawa
The former student council president and vice-chairman of the Future Foundation, who is close friends with Chisa and Juzo. He is the one responsible for building an overseas branch of Hope's Peak Academy, which is used as the setting for the Monokuma Hunter game. Kyosuke believes in spreading hope under any means necessary, even going as far as to resort to murder to achieve it. These feelings were exploited and compounded by Chisa, who was brainwashed by Junko as an agent of Despair. He has a strong hatred towards Makoto, feeling he cannot understand the despair he has felt because of the tragedy. His forbidden action is "opening doors." He is later deceived by Kazuo that every Future Foundation member in the game is an attacker, leading him to kill Kazuo and wound Juzo, but eventually stops his hatred after learning the truth, becoming one of the game's survivors. Feeling guilty over his actions, he accepts Makoto's way of thinking and takes his leave, determined to find a way to atone for his mistakes. His title is "Former Ultimate Student Council President" (元超高校級の「生徒会長」, Moto Chō kōkō-kyū no "Seitokaichō"; lit. Former Super High School Level Student Council President).

=== Chisa Yukizome ===
Chisa Yukizome (雪染 ちさ, Yukizome Chisa)
Voiced by (English): Colleen Clinkenbeard
Voiced by (Japanese): Mai Nakahara
A housekeeper and the former assistant homeroom teacher of the 77th class, who is close friends with Kyosuke and Juzo. While optimistic in her teachings, her real mission was to investigate the Reserve Class and learn what Hope's Peak Academy was up to. She was later captured by Junko and lobotomized by Mukuro, converting her into Ultimate Despair. she is the first to die in the Monokuma Hunter game, killing herself after being influenced by Monokuma's brainwashing despair video at the start of the game. Her title is "Former Ultimate Housekeeper" (元超高校級の「家政婦」, Moto Chō kōkō-kyū no "Kaseifu"; lit. Former Super High School Level Housekeeper) and her forbidden action is "Kyosuke Munakata dying".

=== Ryota Mitarai ===
Ryota Mitarai (御手洗 亮太, Mitarai Ryōta)
Voiced by (English): Justin Briner
Voiced by (Japanese): Kanata Hongō
A nervous animator who was one of the students in the 77th class. Having been bullied a lot during his childhood, Ryota found solace in anime and had the Ultimate Imposter take his place in class so that he could stay at home to work on an anime that would save the world. By using various techniques such as subliminal messaging, Ryota can use his anime to provoke reactions among people who viewed it. However, he was manipulated by Junko, who used his techniques to make a brainwashing despair video that turns whoever watches it to become a Remnant of Despair. He later becomes a member of the Future Foundation and becomes involved in the Monokuma Hunter game. It is later revealed that the same brainwashing techniques were used by Kazuo to brainwash participants into killing themselves under the guise of the attacker, driving Ryota over the edge and provoking a nervous breakdown where he decides Kazuo was right to remove humanity's ability to feel despair or any other negative emotions. After the bangles are shut down and he is no longer afflicted by his forbidden action, "using his talent," Ryota prepares to use a hope video to do the opposite of Junko's despair video, which would also render humanity largely emotionless. However, he is stopped by Hajime and his classmates, who take them with him towards a new future. His title is "Former Ultimate Animator" (元超高校級の「アニメーター」, Moto Chō kōkō-kyū no "Animētā"; lit. Former Super High School Level Animator).

=== Daisaku Bandai ===
Daisaku Bandai (万代 大作, Bandai Daisaku)
Voiced by (English): Tia Ballard
Voiced by (Japanese): Rie Kugimiya
A kind-hearted farmer who has a muscular build but a childlike voice. He is the second victim in the Monokuma Hunter game, killed by the poison in his wristband as a result of triggering his forbidden action: "witnessing violent behavior" when Juzo attacks Ryota. His title is "Former Ultimate Farmer" (元超高校級の「農家」, Moto Chō kōkō-kyū no "Nōka"; lit. Former Super High School Level Farmer).

=== Great Gozu ===
Great Gozu (グレート・ゴズ, Gurēto Gozu)
Voiced by (English): Chris Rager
Voiced by (Japanese): Kenta Miyake
A masked wrestler with a strong sense of justice. He is the third victim in the Monokuma Hunter game, killing himself after being subjected to the despair video during the second time limit. His title is "Former Ultimate Wrestler" (元超高校級の「レスラー」, Moto Chō kōkō-kyū no "Resurā"; lit. Former Super High School Level Wrestler) and his forbidden action is "being pinned to the ground for a three-count."

=== Kazuo Tengan ===
Kazuo Tengan (天願 和夫, Tengan Kazuo)
Voiced by (English): Mark Stoddard
Voiced by (Japanese): Hidekatsu Shibata
The chairman of the Future Foundation and former headmaster of Hope's Peak Academy. Despite his old age, he is a capable fighter who uses a chuusen. His forbidden action is "answering a question with a lie." He is the fourth person to be killed in the Monokuma Hunter game, killed by Kyosuke after telling him the identity of the attacker and injuring his eye. He is later revealed to have been the mastermind behind the killing game, using it as a means to convince Ryota to use his Hope Video after having been driven towards increasingly extremist views on hope by the brainwashed Chisa. His title is "Former Hope's Peak Academy Headmaster" (元希望ヶ峰学園学園長, Moto Kibōgamine Gakuen Gakuen-chō).

=== Seiko Kimura ===
Seiko Kimura (忌村 静子, Kimura Seiko)
Voiced by (English): Erin Fitzgerald
Voiced by (Japanese): Saki Fujita
A pharmacist capable of making various medicines and drugs who wears a flu mask to cover her braces and has a condition that keeps her from eating sweets. By taking large amounts of drugs, she can power up her body. She was once friends with Ruruka before an incident caused by Nagito led to her, Ruruka, and Sonosuke getting expelled, since she believes Ruruka framed her. Her forbidden action is "letting someone step on her shadow." She is the fifth victim in the Monokuma Hunter game, killing herself after being subjected to the despair video during the third time limit. Before her death, she manages to make an antidote for the bangle's poison, which helps to save Kyoko. Her title is "Former Ultimate Pharmacist" (元超高校級の「薬剤師」, Moto Chō kōkō-kyū no "Yakuzaishi"; lit. Former Super High School Level Pharmacist).

=== Sonosuke Izayoi ===
Sonosuke Izayoi (十六夜 惣之助, Izayoi Sōnosuke)
Voiced by (English): Brandon McInnis
Voiced by (Japanese): Takuya Eguchi
A blacksmith who is in a relationship with Ruruka, who calls him "Yoi-chan" for short, and enjoys her sweets. He is the sixth victim in the Monokuma Hunter game, killed by Ruruka after she triggers his forbidden action: "putting food in his mouth" in order to prevent him from escaping the game and triggering her own action. His title is "Former Ultimate Blacksmith" (元超高校級の「鍛冶屋」, Moto Chō kōkō-kyū no "Kajiya"; lit. Former Super High School Level Blacksmith).

=== Koichi Kizakura ===
Koichi Kizakura (黄桜 公一, Kizakura Kōichi)
Voiced by (English): Kaiji Tang
Voiced by (Japanese): Keiji Fujiwara
The former homeroom teacher of Hope Peak Academy's 77th class, whose job was to scout students for the school. He has a close relationship with Jin Kirigiri and made a promise with him to protect Kyoko. He is the seventh victim in the game, killed by poison for triggering his forbidden action, "opening his left hand," in order to save Kyoko from falling down a pit created by Ruruka. His title is "Former Hope's Peak Academy Student Scout" (元希望ヶ峰学園生徒スカウトマン, Moto Kibōgamine Gakuen Seito Sukautoman; lit. Former Super High School Level Student Scout).

=== "Miaya Gekkogahara" ===
"Miaya Gekkogahara" (「月光ヶ原 美彩」, "Gekkōgahara Miaya")
A shy and silent programmer who sits in a wheelchair and communicates through the Usami/Monomi program. Her forbidden action is allegedly "making right turns." She is later revealed to be a robot under the control of Monaca, who killed the real Miaya in her home by breaking her neck. After Monaca abandons her goal of despair, the robot is used by Komaru to contact Makoto before it switches to automatic control and is subsequently destroyed by Kyosuke, technically making her the eighth victim. Her title is "Former Ultimate Therapist" (元超高校級の「セラピスト」, Moto Chō kōkō-kyū no "Serapisuto"; lit. Former Super High School Level Therapist).

=== Ruruka Ando ===
Ruruka Ando (安藤 流流歌, Andō Ruruka)
Voiced by (English): Jad Saxton
Voiced by (Japanese): Inori Minase
A candy maker who is close with Izayoi and was friends with Seiko up until high school. Following a mix-up caused by Nagito that led to her expulsion from Hope's Peak, she harbors hatred towards Seiko, believing that she betrayed her. Her forbidden action is "letting anyone escape the game," which leads her to kill Izayoi when he comes across an alleged exit, and attempts to kill Kyoko for investigating Izayoi's body which results in Koichi's death. She becomes the game's ninth victim, killing herself after becoming subjected to the despair video during the fourth time limit. Her title is "Former Ultimate Confectioner" (元超高校級の「お菓子職人」, Moto Chō kōkō-kyū no "Okashi Shokunin"; lit. Former Super High School Level Confectioner).

=== Juzo Sakakura ===
Juzo Sakakura (逆蔵 十三, Sakakura Jūzō)
Voiced by (English): Ian Sinclair
Voiced by (Japanese): Junichi Suwabe
A boxer who is friends with Kyosuke and Chisa, and worked at Hope's Peak Academy as a security guard and spy for Kyosuke. His forbidden action is "punching someone." As he has romantic feelings for Kyosuke, Junko uses this information to blackmail him into letting her go free in order to keep them a secret. During the game, he is stabbed by Kyosuke after he believes him to be a Remnant of Despair. Using the last of his strength, Juzo cuts off his arm to remove his bangle and manages to shut off power to the facility and bangles before bleeding to death, becoming the game's tenth and final victim. His title is "Former Ultimate Boxer" (元超高校級の「ボクサー」, Moto Chō kōkō-kyū no "Bokusā"; lit. Former Super High School Level Boxer).

== Danganronpa V3: Killing Harmony ==
=== Shuichi Saihara ===
Shuichi Saihara (最原 終一, Saihara Shūichi)
Voiced by (English): Grant George
Voiced by (Japanese): Megumi Hayashibara
The protagonist of Danganronpa V3, whose title is "Ultimate Detective" (超高校級の「探偵」, Chō kōkō-kyū no "Tantei"), the same as that of Kyoko Kirigiri. A soft spoken, unsure boy, Shuichi lacks the self-confidence to strive to his full potential. Though well known in the police department for solving numerous murder cases as an apprentice to his uncle, he believes he does not deserve his Ultimate title due to him solving cases by chance. However, after developing a close bond with Kaede, she motivates him and helps raise his self-esteem, which results in Shuichi quickly becoming a central figure during the class trials. Following Kaede's death, Shuichi becomes close with his fellow students, Kaito and Maki. He later survives the game alongside Maki and Himiko and resolves to discover whatever reality awaits him in the real world.

=== Kaede Akamatsu ===
Kaede Akamatsu (赤松 楓, Akamatsu Kaede)
Voiced by (English): Erika Harlacher
Voiced by (Japanese): Sayaka Kanda
The false protagonist of Danganronpa V3 whose title is "Ultimate Pianist" (超高校級の「ピアニスト」, Chō kōkō-kyū no "Pianisuto"). She is claimed to be a cheerful, optimistic hard worker with blooming talent. She is called "piano freak" by her friends before coming to the academy because she dedicates herself to piano so thoroughly. After winning numerous competitions, she was given her title. While encouraging the other students to trust one another and work together, she strives to get them all out of the school, repeatedly reaffirming, "Once we get out, we'll all be friends." Kaede's desperation to end the killing game drives her to concoct a plan to murder the Mastermind, seemingly leading to the death of the innocent Rantaro. She is executed by a noose being tied around her neck, where she is dragged and dropped by the Monokubs, dropping her body to play each note. She suffocates and dies while her classmates watch. The lid of the piano, covered in spikes drops down on her, crushing her and hiding her body away. In Chapter 6, it is revealed that Kaede's plan had actually failed to kill anyone, but that the Mastermind proceeded to kill Rantaro and have Kaede framed for the murder anyway. Prior to entering the game, much like everyone else, it's believed Kaede was an ordinary individual who willingly had her previous life's memories erased in order to compete on the killing show with talent and fake background. Her execution is named "Der Flohwalzer".

=== K1-B0 ===
K1-B0 (キーボ, Kībo)
Voiced by (English): Lucien Dodge
Voiced by (Japanese): Tetsuya Kakihara
A well-mannered robot created by Professor Iidabashi (飯田橋博士, Īdabashi hakase), with a maturing A.I., meaning he is constantly evolving and learning. K1-B0, also known as Keebo, is the "Ultimate Robot" (超高校級の「ロボット」, Chō kōkō-kyū no "Robotto"). He does not get along with Kokichi, as Kokichi often teases Keebo due to his nature of not understanding jokes and sarcasm, and often ridicules his possibilities, which annoys Keebo to no end since he is a strong defender of robot rights and an opposer of robophobia. Throughout the game, he hears a voice in his head telling him what to do, and often listens to said voice. However, after his ahoge is destroyed in Chapter 5, he ponders the nature of hope and despair and notes the absence of the voice inside his head, subsequently going on a destructive rampage and leaving Shuichi and the remaining survivors with only until dawn to unearth the Mastermind of the killing game. Keebo is later revealed to be a creation of the Danganronpa reality show production team, with his past memories of Professor Iidabashi having all been lies. Keebo temporarily becomes the playable character in Chapter 6, before having his A.I. erased and replaced with the audience to vote on the fate of the killing game show at the end of the trial. Although he survives the final trial, he launches an attack on the school and self-destructs to destroy the dome surrounding the school and execute Tsumugi, effectively making him the final casualty of the game.

=== Maki Harukawa ===
Maki Harukawa (春川 魔姫, Harukawa Maki)
Voiced by (English): Erica Mendez
Voiced by (Japanese): Maaya Sakamoto
A quiet and cynical girl who rarely shows emotion during conversation. Despite her talent, she openly states she does not like children despite them liking her, as she was raised in an orphanage. Initially, Maki introduced herself as the "Ultimate Child Caregiver" (超高校級の「保育士」, Chō kōkō-kyū no "Hoiku-shi"; Super High School Level Nursery School Teacher), although this was later revealed to be a mere fabrication for the killing game. In Chapter 2, Kokichi unveils her true talent as the "Ultimate Assassin," (超高校級の「暗殺者」, Chō kōkō-kyū no "Ansatsusha") after viewing Maki's motivation video which stated her talent. It is revealed in Chapter 4 that she had been sold out by the orphanage and lived with a group of assassins, where she learned her skills in murder that earned her title. Throughout the game, she gradually becomes close with Shuichi and Kaito, the latter of whom she develops romantic feelings for, identifying him as the first person whom she has ever opened up to; like every other event in the game, however, the mastermind states this to be the result of the Danganronpa reality show's production team's machinations. She later survives the killing game along with Shuichi and Himiko.

=== Himiko Yumeno ===
Himiko Yumeno (夢野 秘密子, Yumeno Himiko)
Voiced by (English): Christine Marie Cabanos
Voiced by (Japanese): Aimi Tanaka
A young magician who can be considered lazy and drowsy, judging by her voice and behaviour. Due to her belief that her palour and basic tricks are real magic, she often offers to use her magic, but backs off after saying she hasn't enough MP. She is the "Ultimate Magician" (超高校級の「マジシャン」, Chō kōkō-kyū no "Majishan"), but she prefers the title "Ultimate Mage" (超高校級の「魔法使い」, Chō kōkō-kyū no "Mahōtsukai"). During the killing game, Tenko takes a liking to her, even though she doesn't realize it yet until after her death. Before Tenko is killed, she gives Himiko a piece of advice to express her emotions more often, and so she does. Her personality drastically changes to an optimistic go-getter. She survives the killing game with Shuichi and Maki.

=== Rantaro Amami ===
Rantaro Amami (天海 蘭太郎, Amami Rantarō)
Voiced by (English): Johnny Yong Bosch
Voiced by (Japanese): Hikaru Midorikawa
A relaxed boy who has no memory of his talent. Unlike the other contestants, he can coldly interrogate Monokuma and the Monokubs. He is the first murder victim, supposedly being hit over the head with a shot-put ball by Kaede; in Chapter 6, this was revealed to be a trap by Tsumugi, who wanted both students out of her affairs. He is given the title of "Ultimate ??? (超高校級の「???」, Chō kōkō-kyū no "???"; Super High School Level ???)" although his true talent is the "Ultimate Survivor" (超高校級の「生存者」, Chō kōkō-kyū no "Seizonsha"), as it is revealed in Chapter 6 that he had previously survived a previous killing game. During School Mode however, he remembers his talent as the "Ultimate Adventurer," (超高校級の「冒険家」, Chō kōkō-kyū no "Bōken-ka") exploring the world in search of his lost sisters.

=== Ryoma Hoshi ===
Ryoma Hoshi (星 竜馬, Hoshi Ryōma)
Voiced by (English): Chris Tergliafera
Voiced by (Japanese): Akio Ōtsuka
A short tennis player who murdered an entire mafia organization and was sentenced to death row before being enrolled at the Ultimate Academy for Gifted Juveniles. He is the "Ultimate Tennis Pro" (超高校級の「テニス選手」, Chō kōkō-kyū no "Tenisu Senshu") and is nicknamed Tennis Killer due to his past. Despite his size, he talks with a very deep voice. He has a serious and pessimistic personality. In Chapter 2, he discovers that there is no one left who cares about him from his motivation video, which is completely blank, and subsequently willingly submits his life to Kirumi Tojo, where he is drowned in his lab's sink and placed in a tank which was used for a magic trick by Himiko, where is body is devoured by pirahnas, making him the second murder victim.

=== Kirumi Tojo ===
Kirumi Tojo (東条 斬美, Tōjō Kirumi)
Voiced by (English): Kira Buckland
Voiced by (Japanese): Kikuko Inoue
A loyal and serious girl who takes care of both chores and the students during the New Killing School Life, who goes by the saying "duty before self." She is the "Ultimate Maid" (超高校級の「メイド」, Chō kōkō-kyū no "Meido"). Her motivation video given to her in Chapter 2 reveals that she is also the de facto prime minister of Japan, with the real one being a stand-in. Fearing for her people's safety in her absence, she planned to escape by killing Ryoma, due to his lackluster will to live, which results in the latter's death by drowning. She is later exposed as the culprit and undergoes an execution where she is forced to climb a thorny vine, where she is cut by sawblades before reaching the top, where the vine snaps and she falls to her death. Her execution is named "Strand of Agony".

=== Angie Yonaga ===
Angie Yonaga (夜長 アンジー, Yonaga Anjī)
Voiced by (English): Cassandra Lee Morris
Voiced by (Japanese): Minori Suzuki
A very religious and spiritual student who sees herself as the vessel of the Island God Atua, often seeming unnaturally positive when plunged into a serious situation. Angie is the "Ultimate Artist" (超高校級の「美術部」, Chō kōkō-kyū no "Bijutsu-bu"; Super High School Level Art Club Member), but she believes that Atua is the one who is her muse when she creates something artistic. She speaks with a Polynesian accent. Angie also has a habit of mentioning blood sacrifices due to her following the Gods of the Island. During Chapter 3, she forms the Student Council to combat the killing game, while ultimately taking away most rights of her fellow students, making her a minor antagonist in the chapter. She is the third murder victim. After discovering Korekiyo's plan to commit murder, he knocked her out, fabricated an elaborate crime scene, and then killed her by plunging a katana into the back of her neck.

=== Tenko Chabashira ===
Tenko Chabashira (茶柱 転子, Chabashira Tenko)
Voiced by (English): Julie Ann Taylor
Voiced by (Japanese): Sora Tokui
An energetic student with a loud nature and voice, often shouting to show her fighting spirit. She is the "Ultimate Aikido Master" (超高校級の「合気道家」, Chō kōkō-kyū no "Aikidō-ka"), having developed a new technique she refers to as "Neo Aikido" with her master, and which is uncharacteristically marked by striking first. Due to a misunderstanding in advice from her master, she has a hatred for boys, seeing that they always shift the blame away from themselves and that they always lie. She also does not like them complimenting or touching her. She is the fourth murder victim, having her neck pierced with a sickle above the cage she was in during the Caged Dog Seance (which was actually a ruse by Korekiyo) trying to contact Angie from beyond the grave.

=== Korekiyo Shinguji ===
Korekiyo Shinguji (真宮寺 是清, Shinguji Korekiyo)
Voiced by (English): Todd Haberkorn
Voiced by (Japanese): Kenichi Suzumura
Nicknamed "Kiyo" in the English version. A cool-headed and intelligent student who shares a deep love for human nature, having traveled all around the world. He is the "Ultimate Anthropologist" (超高校級の「民俗学者」, Chō kōkō-kyū no "Minzoku Gakusha"). He always wears a zipper mask around his mouth, even when eating. Due to his appearance, he openly admits he looks like a potential murderer. Prior to the game, Korekiyo had been a serial killer who had taken to murdering women he found exceptional so that his deceased older sister (whom he was allegedly in an incestuous relationship with) would have company in the afterlife. He also has a self-fabricated split personality of her which is triggered every time he removes his mask, this split personality showed up when he was tortured with a rope by an unnamed tribe. Under his mask is lipstick, signifying his female split personality. He murders both Angie and Tenko in Chapter 3 and is executed by being boiled in a pot, before his spirit is banished to the afterlife by Monokuma and the spirit of his sister. His execution is named "Cultural Melting Pot".

=== Miu Iruma ===
Miu Iruma (入間 未兎, Iruma Miu)
Voiced by (English): Wendee Lee
Voiced by (Japanese): Haruka Ishida
A brash narcissist who is renowned for inventing many useful inventions, but often regards them as failures due to her motto: "How can you live life when you're so relaxed it's like you're still asleep?" She is the "Ultimate Inventor" (超高校級の「発明家」, Chō kōkō-kyū no "Hatsumeika"). Her persona of being dirty-mouthed, perverted and rude drops when her insults are flung back at her. She attempts to murder Kokichi and frame Kaito for it in Chapter 4 inside a Virtual World she modified. However, her plan backfires when Kokichi tricks Gonta into strangling her to death in the virtual reality world with toilet paper, which has the same effect in the real world, killing her.

=== Gonta Gokuhara ===
Gonta Gokuhara (獄原 ゴン太, Gokuhara Gonta)

Voiced by (English): Kaiji Tang
Voiced by (Japanese): Shunsuke Takeuchi

A gentleman and a large arthropod-lover, saying he can commune with the animal world after he was raised by wolves as a child (though later admits to it actually being dinosaur people). He is the "Ultimate Entomologist" (超高校級の「昆虫博士」, Chō kōkō-kyū no "Konchū Hakase"). He is against violence and wants nothing to do with the killing game. He's shown to be extremely protective of the rest of the group and very often offers to risk his own safety to ensure the well-being of the rest. In Chapter 4 he is found to be Miu's murderer, having been tricked into doing so by Kokichi Oma after thinking it would be the only way to "save" her from the despair-inducing horrors of the "real world" he saw via Monokuma's motive. Despite suffering from amnesia due to a malfunction of the VR headset and not remembering anything in the trial, he's eventually outed as the culprit. He is executed via Monokuma shooting mechanical venomous wasps at him, before a giant wasp emerges out of Monophanie's stomach and impales him, before being set ablaze with a flamethrower. His execution is named "Wild West Insecticide".

=== Kokichi Oma ===
Kokichi Oma (王馬 小吉, Ōma Kokichi)

Voiced by (English): Derek Stephen Prince
Voiced by (Japanese): Hiro Shimono

A childlike and sly prankster who is the self-proclaimed leader of a group called D.I.C.E. with over 10,000 members, though it is later revealed the group was simply a gang of eleven pranksters and petty criminals whose motto is "no killing". His title is the "Ultimate Supreme Leader" (超高校級の「総統」, Chō kōkō-kyū no "Sōtō"). Deceptive and clever, he tends to claim he enjoys the killing game and is often at odds with the rest of the group, most notably Kaito and Maki, though his true intentions are often ambiguous due to his habit of constantly lying. Investigating his talent research room in Chapter 6 reveals Kokichi to be extremely intelligent, with him having correctly pinpointed the murderer, victim, and murder weapon of all previous killings up to that point. After blackmailing Kaito through saving his life, the two conspired together to create a virtually unsolvable murder and make it impossible for the game to continue. This was achieved by having Kaito crush Kokichi's body with a press machine beyond recognition, with the intent of hiding who the victim of the murder was.

=== Kaito Momota ===
Kaito Momota (百田 解斗, Momota Kaito)
Voiced by (English): Kyle Hebert
Voiced by (Japanese): Ryōhei Kimura
A passionate boy whose dream is to go into space, going so far as to fabricate documents to bypass controls and become a proper astronaut at such a young age. His title is the "Ultimate Astronaut" (超高校級の「宇宙飛行士」, Chō kōkō-kyū no "Uchū Hikō-shi"), despite how he never actually went to space prior to the killing game. He is also comical, over-exaggerating his emotions and actions. He quickly develops a brotherly bond with Shuichi and becomes interested in Maki in-game, going out of his way to protect them at all costs. Haunted by a chronic disease that is slowly killing him, he resolves to himself that he won't let himself die because of the killing game. Kaito murdered Kokichi at the latter's request in Chapter 5, and is sentenced to an execution in a similar fashion to that of Jin Kirigiri from the first game, but dies due to his chronic disease before he can be successfully executed. His failed execution is named "Blast Off! Second ignition".

=== Tsumugi Shirogane ===
Tsumugi Shirogane (白銀 つむぎ, Shirogane Tsumugi)
Voiced by (English): Dorothy Elias-Fahn
Voiced by (Japanese): Mikako Komatsu
The antagonist of Danganronpa V3. A quiet student who is a plain-dressed otaku who tends to add famous anime quotes into conversations and often daydreams about the subject. Despite being the "Ultimate Cosplayer," (超高校級の「コスプレイヤー」, Chō kōkō-kyū no "Kosupureiyā") she only designs costumes for others, preferring not to wear them herself, and loathes dressing up as non-fictional characters to the extent that she breaks out in hives if she attempts to do so. She identifies herself as "the 53rd generation of Junko Enoshima" and the mastermind of the New Killing School Life during the Chapter 6 trial, being part of the production team responsible for creating the Danganronpa reality show and a violently obsessive fan of the show in her own right. She is also revealed as having set up Kaede as Rantaro's killer to dispose of the two for interfering starting off the killing game. She attempts to break the remaining contestants by showing them Shuichi, Kaede, and Kaito's audition tapes, though it is heavily implied that the interviews were fabricated. Tsumugi is executed by Keebo when she orders him to launch an assault on the school after seeing that the audience no longer desires the continuation of the show; despondent at the loss of the one thing she loved, she allows herself to be crushed by a large boulder along with Monokuma. Hers and Monokuma's execution is named "Ultimate Annihilation".

=== Monokubs ===
The Monokubs (モノクマーズ, Monokumāzu; The Monokumarz)
Voiced by: Kōichi Yamadera
The Monokubs, whom are Monokuma's self proclaimed children, serve as the secondary antagonists of Danganronpa V3 under Tsumugi's control. Each of them were killed during the executions. After the trial during Chapter 5, they came back to life as spares. During the trial of Chapter 6, they were blown up by Monokuma's detonator.

==== Monotaro ====
Monotaro (モノタロウ, Monotarō)
Voiced by: Sean Chiplock
The leader of the Monokubs who is colored red and wears a scarf. He is the designated leader, though he is the most clumsy of the five with an extremely forgetful personality. In Chapter 4 he falls in love with his sister Monophanie and enters into a relationship with her. He meets his demise during Gonta's execution, being beheaded by a massive robotic wasp.

==== Monodam ====
Monodam (モノダム, Monodamu)
Voiced by: Jason Wishnov
A mostly silent, robotic Monokub who is colored green. His reason for being silent is said to be because he has closed off his heart from Monokid's bullying. In Chapter 3 he briefly overthrows Monokuma and rules over the school before Monotaro and Monophanie call his competency into question and beg for Monokuma to come back. He murders Monokid and Monosuke during the first and second chapter executions, respectively, then kills himself during Kiyo's execution after failing to get along with Monotaro and Monophanie.

==== Monosuke ====
Monosuke (モノスケ)
Voiced by: Brian Beacock
A chatty Monokub who is colored yellow with black stripes and wears glasses who speaks with a Brooklyn accent and hates getting along. He is killed during Kirumi's execution from being crushed by her fall after being pushed by Monodam.

==== Monokid ====
Monokid (モノキッド, Monokiddo)
Voiced by: Patrick Seitz
A brash, loud Monokub who is colored blue, carries a guitar, and has star shapes around his eyes. He loves bullying Monodam and making gross jokes. He is killed during Kaede's execution after being pushed into the giant piano by Monodam.

==== Monophanie ====
Monophanie (モノファニー, Monofanī)
Voiced by: Natalie Hoover
A flowery, gentler Monokub who is colored pink and holds flowers. She hates gore and violence. In Chapter 4 she falls in love with her brother Monotaro and enters a relationship with him. She is killed during Gonta's execution after a giant mechanical wasp emerges from her stomach.

== Danganronpa/Zero ==
=== Ryoko Otonashi ===
Ryoko Otonashi (音無 涼子, Otonashi Ryōko)
The protagonist of Danganronpa/Zero and the Ultimate Analyst. She was diagnosed with a psychological disorder that causes her constant loss of short and long-term memories, forgetting things shortly after she learns them. Hence, she writes everything down in a notebook she carries with her at all times. She is in love with her neurologist, Yasuke Matsuda, whom she visits frequently for check-ups. It is eventually revealed that in actuality, Ryoko is actually Junko suffering from amnesia, the product of her experimentation with various memory-erasing techniques in preparation for the first mutual killing game. Upon learning the truth while being killed by Yasuke, Ryoko falls into despair and kills Yasuke, subsequently reassuming the identity of Junko to spread despair once more.

=== Yasuke Matsuda ===
Yasuke Matsuda (松田 夜助, Matsuda Yasuke)
The Ultimate Neurologist (超高校級の「神経学者」, Chō kōkō-kyū no "Shinkei Gakusha"), Ryoko's abrasive love interest and the one she visits for check-ups regarding her psychological state. Ironically, Yasuke is actually the cause of her current condition; he was roped into helping Junko test memory-wiping procedures prior to the events of the novels, and in doing so, removed all her memories. He later catalyses Junko's reawakening. He is killed in a fit of despair by Ryoko after she regains her memories and his body is mutilated post-mortem.

=== Yuto Kamishiro ===
Yuto Kamishiro (神代 優兎, Kamishiro Yūto)
The Ultimate Secret Agent (超高校級の「諜報員」, Chō kōkō-kyū no "Chōhōin"). He assists Ryoko in investigating the murders of the Hope's Peak Academy School Board members in Danganronpa/Zero. He has his neck fatally broken by Yasuke.

=== The Madarai Brothers ===
The Madarai Brothers (斑井兄弟, Madarai kyōdai)
Though originally assumed to be just one man named Isshiki Madarai with the title Super High School Level Bodyguard (超高校級の「ボディーガード」, Chō kōkō-kyū no "bodīgādo"), it is later revealed that he is actually one of eight identical siblings including Isshiki, Nisshiki, Misshiki, Yosshiki, Sasshiki, Rosshiki, Shisshiki and Yasshiki. With superhuman synchronization skills, they pose as one, their true shared talent being the Ultimate Multiple Birth Siblings (超高校級の「多胎児」, Chō kōkō-kyū no "tataiji").

=== Soshun Murasame ===
Soshun Murasame (村雨 早春, Murasame Sōshun)
The Ultimate Student Council President (超高校級の「生徒会長」, Chō kōkō-kyū no "Seitokaichō"). He was involved in the prototype mutual killing game. He pretended to be in a coma afterward until Yasuke strangles him to death as he has a breakdown.

== Danganronpa Gaiden: Killer Killer ==
=== Takumi Hijirihira ===
Takumi Hijirihira (聖原 拓実, Hijirihira Takumi)
The protagonist of Danganronpa Gaiden: Killer Killer. A member of the Future Foundation 6th Branch's Special Cases Bureau and a survivor of a large scale massacre at Giboura Middle School perpetrated by Mukuro Ikusaba, for whom he developed a secret admiration. He has a habit of crawling into closed spaces, believed to be a reminder of the tragedy he witnessed. Unbeknownst to others, Takumi has an admiration for murderers and is himself a murderer known alternatively as Killer Killer (キラーキラー, KirāKirā), who scores murders based on his personal criteria and, if they fail to impress him, kills the killer to show them how their method would look if done "correctly." It is eventually revealed that the 6th Division knows about his murderous tendencies, but does not act because he is ultimately only killing other murderers. Takumi has stated that he has lived in Spain for a while, although exactly when is unknown.

=== Misaki Asano ===
Misaki Asano (麻野 美咲, Asano Misaki)
The heroine of Danganronpa Gaiden: Killer Killer, who is partnered with Takumi in the Special Cases Bureau.

=== Mekuru Katsuragi ===
Mekuru Katsuragi (葛城 めくる, Katsuragi Mekuru)
An investigator in the Sixth Branch who appears in Danganronpa Gaiden: Killer Killer.

=== Shuji Fujigawa ===
Shuji Fujigawa (藤川 修二, Fujigawa Shūji)
Takumi's middle school friend and the original Killer Killer. Shuji was originally a fairly normal middle school student who dreamed of being a police officer until an event prior to the Tragedy caused him to snap and develop an obsession with "cleaning" the world of murder, which he sees as an "inherently disgusting and dirty thing." He then traveled all over the world, hunting down serial killers as a sort of vigilante, until he returned to Japan one day and discovered that Takumi was also murdering killers in order to recreate the beauty he saw in Mukuro's massacre. Horrified, Shuji decided that he needed to "save" Takumi from himself by any means, even if that means wiping out all of humanity, due to them all being, in his eyes, potential serial killers.

== Kirigiri Sou ==
=== Kouhei Matsudaira ===
Kouhei Matsudaira (松平公平, Matsudaira Kouhei)
A Normal Freshman (師範大学生, "Shihan Daigakusei") and protagonist of Otogirisō who assists Kyoko in her investigations after almost hitting her with his car while driving at night.

=== Santa Shikiba ===
Santa Shikiba (色葉 田田田, Shikiba Santa)
The Ultimate Botanist (超高校級の「植物学者」, Chō kōkō-kyū no "Shokubutsu Gakusha") and the creator of Kyoka and the Monokuma Flower in the school's garden in Hope's Peak Academy. He is presumed to have been killed during the Tragedy.

=== Kyoka Kirigiri ===
Kyoka Kirigiri (霧切 キョウカ, Kirigiri Kyoka)
The Ultimate Invader (究極の侵略者, Kyūkyoku no "Shinryaku-sha") and a plant-human hybrid doppelgänger of Kyoko created by Santa Shikiba using her DNA, who, disillusioned with the outside world, lures humans to her mansion so that she can kill them and serve their corpses as nutrition for her humanoid plant siblings, to keep them alive and alleviate her own loneliness.

=== Rhino Gradetina ===
Rhino Gradentia (鼻行類, Gradentia Rhino)
Kyoka's plant-alien hybrid siblings and the other Ultimate Invaders (究極の侵略者, Kyūkyoku no "Shinryaku-sha"), who eat human corpses for sustenance using their tentacle-like branches.

== Other characters ==
=== Yui Samidare ===
Yui Samidare (五月雨 結, Samidare Yui)
The protagonist of Danganronpa Kirigiri, who works with Kyoko throughout the novel series.

=== Blue Ink ===
Blue Ink (青インク, Inku Ao)
The protagonist of Danganronpa: Togami, who works with Byakuya throughout the novel trilogy.

=== Suisei Nanamura ===
Suisei Nanamura (七村 彗星, Nanamura Suisei)
An antagonist of Danganronpa Kirigiri, and supporting character of Danganronpa: Togami, a gay detective who respectively works against Kyoko and trains a young Polaris P. Polanski as his assistant.

=== Sakutaro Higashi ===
Sakutaro Higashi (東 才空太郎, Higashi Sakutaro)
Voiced by (English): Griffin Burns
Voiced by (Japanese): Natsuki Hanae
An androgynous and mysterious student who makes an appearance in the Slayhem Mode of Danganronpa 2×2, and who is dragged into the class trials. Their talent is initially unknown.
