= St. John's Wort (film) =

2001 film by Ten Shimoyama

- Film poster
- Directed by: Ten Shimoyama
- Screenplay by: Goro Nakajima
- Based on: Otogirisō by Shukei Nagasaka
- Starring: Megumi Okina; Yōichirō Saitō; Kōji Ōkura; Reiko Matsuo
- Cinematography: Kazuhiko Ogura
- Edited by: Seigo Hirasawa
- Music by: Asako Yoshida
- Production companies: Kadokawa Shoten; Asmik Ace Entertainment; Toho; Imagica
- Distributed by: Toho
- Release date: January 27, 2001 (Japan)
- Running time: 85 minutes
- Country: Japan
- Language: Japanese

St. John's Wort (Japanese: 弟切草, Hepburn: Otogirisō) is a 2001 Japanese horror film directed by Ten Shimoyama, based on Chunsoft's visual novel Otogirisō.

== Cast ==
- Megumi Okina (Nami Kikushima/Naomi Kaizawa)
- Yōichirō Saitō (Kōhei Matsudaira)
- Kōji Ōkura (Shinichi Ukita)
- Reiko Matsuo (Tōko Ozeki)
- Minoru Terada (Soichi Kaizawa)

== Release ==
St. John's Wort was released in Japan on January 27, 2001. It was shown at the Fantasia Film Festival in Montreal, Canada on July 13, 2001. It was released in both an English-dub and subtitled edition by Asylum Home Entertainment on March 23, 2004.

The film was released on Blu-ray with Japanese audio and English subtitles by Arrow Video as part of the J-Horror Rising box set on October 29th, 2025.

== Reception ==
St. John's Wort received mixed critical reviews. Paste Magazine criticized the film's supererogation as a whole, citing the framing device and the visuals to be "way, way too much for what's supposed to be an atmospheric exploration of a creepy old manor". However, the movie had "enough going on that it's hard for your attention to wander", and was enough to keep Paste entertained. The movie ranked 42nd out of Paste Magazine's list of 75 live-action video game movies.
