= Kirigiri Sou =

2016 video game

- The main title screen of Kirigiri Sou
- Developer: Spike Chunsoft
- Publisher: Spike Chunsoft
- Director: Takekuni Kitayama
- Producers: Takekuni Kitayama; Kazutaka Kodaka
- Designers: Keiji Namiura; Akira Takayama
- Programmer: Yoshinori Shirasaka
- Artist: Rui Komatsuzaki
- Writers: Seiichiro Jinno; Story: Takekuni Kitayama
- Composer: Yasuyuki Sato
- Series: Danganronpa
- Platforms: Windows, OS X
- Release: November 25, 2016
- Genre: Visual novel
- Mode: Single-player

Kirigiri Sou (Note: Japanese: 霧切草; lit. Fog Cutting Grass) is a visual novel game developed by Spike Chunsoft for Microsoft Windows. The game is the second spin-off of the Danganronpa series of visual novel games following Danganronpa Another Episode: Ultra Despair Girls, set between the events of the Danganronpa Kirigiri light novel series and Danganronpa: Trigger Happy Havoc, while also serving as a crossover sequel to the 1992 Chunsoft game Otogirisō. The game was released in Japan on Windows and OS X on November 25, 2016, bundled with the third Blu-ray box set of anime series Danganronpa 3: The End of Hope's Peak High School. It was well-received by critics, who enjoyed its visuals and storyline.

== Gameplay ==
Kirigiri Sou is a visual novel in which the player controls Kouhei Matsudaira and Kyoko Kirigiri from the adventure games Otogirisō and Danganronpa: Trigger Happy Havoc, where the player aims to investigate a seemingly abandoned mansion in the woods; unlike the original game, which uses 2D cutouts for characters, Kirigiri Sou solely uses background slides accompanied by character sound files. The player character is provided choices as to potential decisions they can make, which appear as arrows; if the player makes enough decisions along different arrows, they can change the main storyline of the game, leading to completely different narratives and endings. The game takes around two to three hours to play through along every route, with a total of eight possible endings along three main narratives.

== Plot ==
=== Characters ===
Kyoko Kirigiri (霧切 響子, Kirigiri Kyoko) – The Ultimate Detective of Hope's Peak Academy, who investigates a series of disappearances at a mysterious mansion after being hired to do so.

Kouhei Matsudaira (松平公平, Matsudaira Kouhei) – The player character and "Normal Freshman", who assists Kyoko in her investigations after almost hitting her with his car.

Kyoka Kirigiri (霧切 キョウカ, Kirigiri Kyoka) – A mysterious hybrid doppelgänger of Kyoko, made from her DNA and spliced with a unicellular organism whose DNA was half-animal and half-plant. In the non-canon Extraterrestrials vs. Earth Plants Against Invaders Defense Force chapter, Kyoka is an alien commander; in the shared dreamscape-set Extra Scenario chapter, Kyoka is depicted as the twin sister of Kyoko, who has become addicted to day trading virtual currency over the internet.

Santa Shikiba (しきば さんた, Shikiba Santa) – The Ultimate Botanist of Hope's Peak Academy, who is implied to have created Kyoka in the canon route. In the non-canon Extraterrestrials vs. Earth Plants Against Invaders Defense Force chapter, he takes on a more prominent role in the fight against the Rhinogradentia, developing a romantic relationship with Kyoka; in the shared dreamscape-set Extra Scenario chapter, he briefly appears as the owner of the mansion, providing Matsudaira CPR while he dreams of kissing Kyoko, briefly awakening him from his coma.

Rhinogradentia (鼻行類, Gradentia Rhino) – The hybrid plant "siblings" of Kyoka created by Santa, depicted in the non-canon Extraterrestrials vs. Earth Plants Against Invaders Defense Force chapter as an alien force of plant hybrids known as the "Super Galaxy Level Invaders", with their role in the canon The Plant Girl narrative being replaced with a series of unnamed plant-human hybrids whom Kyoka lures humans to so that they may kill and eat them for sustenance, keeping them alive. In the shared dreamscape-set Extra Scenario chapter, Matsudaira sees a single Rhinogradentia alongside Hiro Hagakure while passing by a fireplace.

Yasuhiro "Hiro" Hagakure (葉隠 康比呂, Hagakure Yasuhiro) – The Ultimate Clairvoyant of Hope's Peak Academy, whom Matsudaira briefly encounters by a fireplace in a shared dreamscape in the Extra Scenario chapter.

=== Story ===
Kirigiri Sou has three main narratives based on the decisions of the player character; the canon narrative chapter, The Plant Girl, depicts normal freshman Kouhei Matsudaira assisting Ultimate Detective Kyoko Kirigiri after she is contacted to investigate her apparent doppelgänger at a mysterious mansion. The non-canon narrative chapters Extraterrestrials vs. Earth Plants Against Invaders Defense Force and Extra Scenario are respectively depicted in the canon narrative as dreams being had by Kouhei Matsudaira after almost crashing his car during the beginning and ending scenes of The Plant Girl and Extra Scenario, with the scenes of Extra Scenario depicting Matsudaira as awake being set an unspecified amount of time after the events of The Plant Girl.

== Development and release ==
Kirigiri Sou was announced and shown in the October 2016 issue of Famitsu by Spike Chunsoft, as a "sound" visual novel for personal computer systems Windows and OS X. The game was developed Danganronpa Kirigiri author Takekuni Kitayama on request of Spike Chunsoft, and was their first video game project. According to Kitayama, he was inspired to create the game by Chunsoft's previous title Otogirisō, ultimately acquiring permission to have the game serve as a crossover sequel to the title in addition to featuring Danganronpa elements and previously unused characters, writing the game's scenario in the style of a Choose Your Own Adventure gamebook.

The game was released on Microsoft Windows and OS X on November 25, 2016, in Japan and China; it was made available bundled with the third Blu-ray box set of anime series Danganronpa 3: The End of Hope's Peak High School, with no individual release announced for players who do not purchase the anime.

== Reception ==
Famitsu and Yahoo! Japan was positive towards the game, describing it as a "legendary sound novel" and hoped that it would lead to more full-scale horror suspense Danganronpa games in future. Daily Headlines praised the game's narrative and gameplay differences compared to the "high-speed reasoning" of the main Danganronpa series, also comparing it to Otogirisō. Natalie, Dengeki Online and Aki Otsuki at 4Gamer.net recommended the game, describing it as horrifying.
