= Rooster Teeth Podcast =

American comedy podcast

- Logo used since September 2016
- Genre: Comedy
- Format: Video and audio
- Language: English

Creative team
- Directed by: Patrick Salazar

Cast and voices
- Starring: Gus Sorola; Burnie Burns; Geoff Ramsey; Joel Heyman; Gavin Free; Jack Pattillo; Barbara Dunkelman; Armando Torres; Griff Milton; Andrew Rosas

Production
- Production: Rooster Teeth
- Length: 45–105 minutes

Publication
- No. of episodes: 798
- Original release: December 9, 2008 – April 22, 2024

Related
- Website: roosterteeth.com/series/rt-podcast

The Rooster Teeth Podcast, formerly known as the Drunk Tank, was a podcast produced by Rooster Teeth that aired weekly from December 9, 2008 to April 22, 2024 and featured various members of Rooster Teeth's staff discussing different topics each week. Throughout its run, main hosts included Rooster Teeth founders Gus Sorola, Burnie Burns, Geoff Ramsey and Joel Heyman as well as Gavin Free, Jack Pattillo and Barbara Dunkelman while Armando Torres, Griff Milton and Andrew Rosas acted as its final hosts. It is sometimes advertised as simply The RT Podcast. It was named Best Gaming Podcast by the Podcast Awards in 2012 and 2013.

== History ==
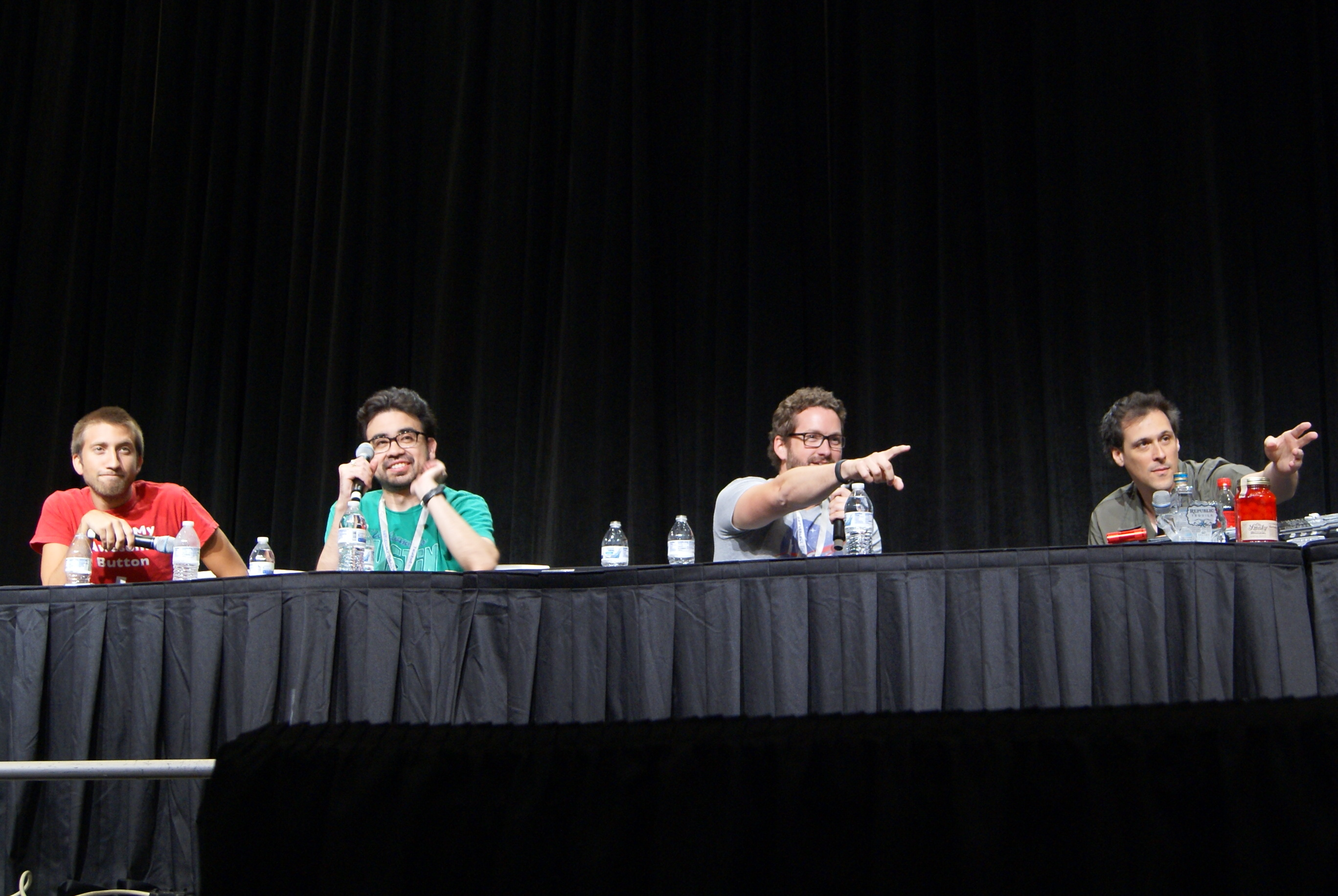
A live presentation of the podcast at RTX 2013, featuring Gavin Free, Gus Sorola, Burnie Burns, and Joel Heyman.

On December 9, 2008, after temporarily reviving a feature on their website from their previous website, 'drunkgamers.com,' Rooster Teeth released their first audio podcast, The Drunk Tank, available for download through iTunes, Zune Marketplace, and their website. It soon became one of the most popular features of the site, at one point becoming the #1 most downloaded podcast on iTunes, as well as a featured podcast in the iTunes Store. New episodes have regularly been released every Wednesday since April 10, 2009, with occasional special episodes or multiple releases in one week. In 2009 they began uploading podcast themed "let's play" style videos on Rooster Teeth's YouTube channel. They later moved these videos to their own Let's Play channel in 2013. On June 23, 2010, the podcast changed to a .m4a "enhanced" format which allows listeners to use an interactive "link dump" to be able to view more information on the topics of the week's podcast.

On September 28, 2011, co-host and Rooster Teeth founder Gus Sorola announced The Drunk Tank was to be re-christened The Rooster Teeth Podcast to create a more unified public image for the company. On August 18, 2010, the podcast was officially implemented into the Rooster Teeth website. To celebrate their 100th episode on February 9, 2011, they released their first-ever video podcast which featured Sorola, Geoff Ramsey and Burnie Burns with Griffon Ramsey as a guest. On January 18, 2012, the podcast gained its first sponsor, Audible.com.

Pizza Hut sold an official Rooster Teeth Podcast pizza in 2014 as part of a brand campaign with Fullscreen, which was nominated for a Streamy Award the following year. In 2016 Pizza Hut sponsored multiple episodes of the podcast as part of a partnership with Rooster Teeth, which received multiple nominations at the 9th Annual Shorty Awards.

A weekly series called Rooster Teeth Animated Adventures features short stories told from the podcast in the form of animation. On September 26, 2016, Sorola unveiled the new set along with the new logo, replacing the one that had been in use since 2011. A live ticketed event was held for the 500th episode. In July 2020 the podcast was part of Spotify’s Vodcast launch lineup.

A 2014 conversation on the podcast about a hypothetical scenario involving an immortal snail became the source of a recurring meme on social media. Videos discussing the snail on TikTok had amassed over 230 million views by November 2021.

Rooster Teeth founders Geoff Ramsey and Joel Heyman as well as Jack Pattillo have all previously served as main hosts of the podcast until individually stepping down, with Heyman having since left the company. Founder Burnie Burns was a regular host until September 2019, but briefly returned in 2020 before leaving the company that June.

In May 2023, Sorola announced he would step down as the podcast's host in June, having worked on the show for 15 years since its inception. In June 2023, the remaining main hosts Barbara Dunkelman and Gavin Free were also announced as leaving the podcast alongside Sorola with Armando Torres, Griff Milton and Andrew Rosas taking over as permanent hosts.

In April 2024, following the announcement of Rooster Teeth's shutdown the previous month, it was announced that the podcast would end while various former hosts returned to guest star in several of the remaining episodes. The final episode was released on April 22, 2024.

In February 2025, Burns acquired the Rooster Teeth brand and some of its remaining intellectual property through his company Box Canyon Productions. Under the new website The Drunk Tank and The Rooster Teeth Podcast are archived separately, Rooster Teeth Animated Adventures was continued, and Burns absorbed his new podcast Morning Somewhere into the Rooster Teeth umbrella.

== Format ==
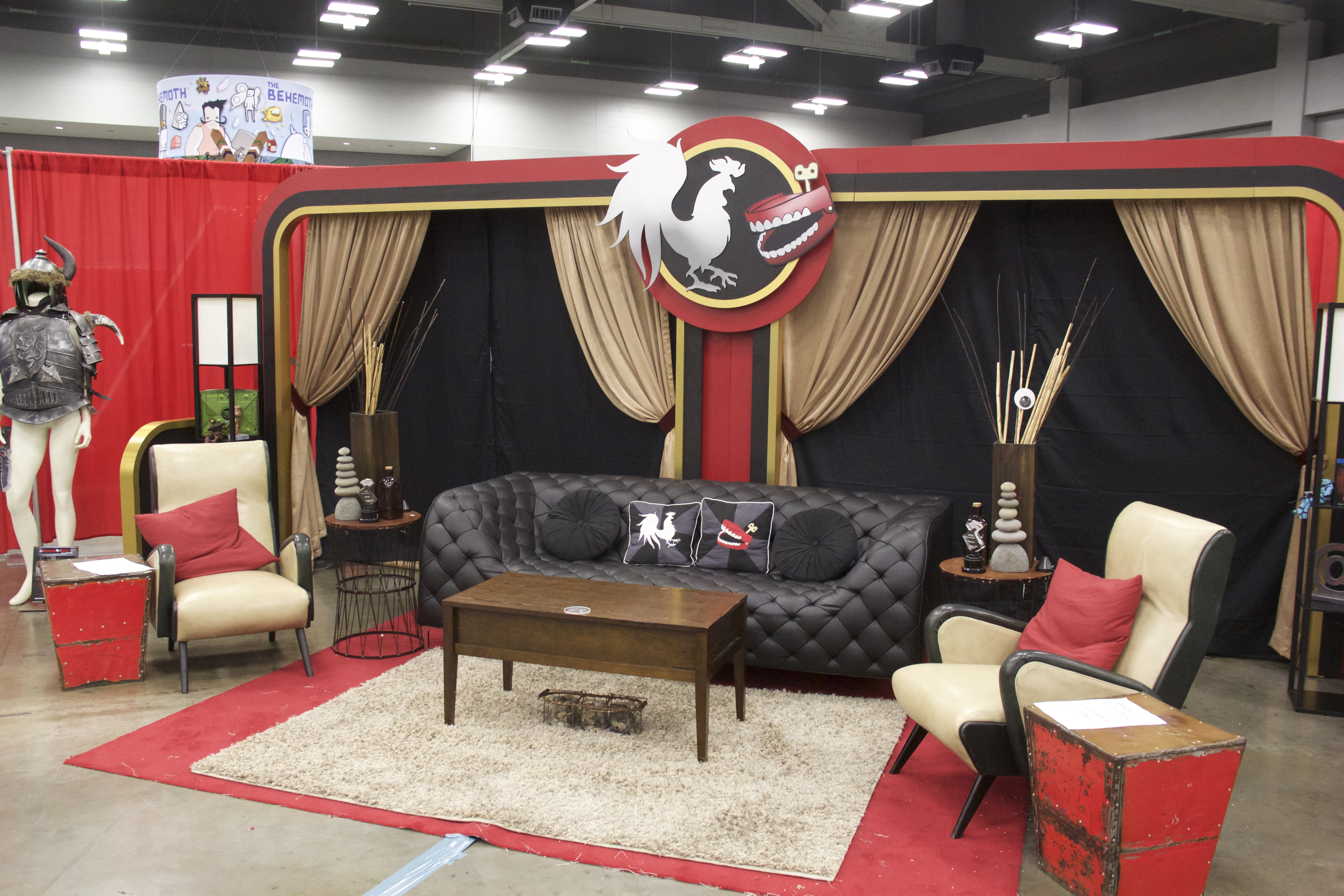
The second podcast set on display at RTX 2015.

Since its inception, the podcast has usually featured three or four Rooster Teeth staff members as the main hosts as well as the occasional guests such as other Rooster Teeth employees, their families and friends or celebrity guests such as Zachary Levi.

The podcast is largely a comedic commentary on the popular culture of the week, including video games, recent news, website features, sports, movies, and television shows. It is also used to announce the company’s upcoming projects, live events such as RTX, as well as occasionally highlighting fan-made projects.
