= Frag Dolls =

Former group of girl gamers

- Founded: 2004
- Folded: May 2015
- Website: www.fragdolls.com

The Frag Dolls were a group of women recruited and employed by Ubisoft with the aim of promoting games made by Ubisoft, including through the participation in esports tournaments. The term refers to three different teams, one each in the United States, the United Kingdom and France. The Frag Dolls were dissolved in May 2015.

== American Frag Dolls ==
=== History ===
Originally recruited by an advertisement on Craigslist in 2004, the first American lineup consisted of seven Frag Dolls (known by their gamer tags): Brookelyn, Eekers, Jinx, Katscratch, Rhoulette, Seppuku, and Valkyrie. Nate Mordo and Rhoulette, full-time Ubisoft employees, helped initiate the group. Eekers, one of the original seven Frag Dolls, left the group in August 2005. Katscratch, another original team member, left in May 2006. In May 2006 two new Frag Dolls, Calyber and Psyche, were recruited as part of an online reality show produced by GameTrailers.

During QuakeCon 2007, the Frag Dolls announced an open casting call looking for new members. Applicants were also able to apply online. Eight finalists were flown into Seattle for the Penny Arcade Expo, where two new members of the team were chosen—Pyra and Mischief. At Major League Gaming Dallas 2008, The Frag Dolls announced Phoenix was joining the team. At her first event as a Frag Doll, they competed in the Rainbow Six: Vegas 2 tournament and took 16th place.

On November 1, 2008, The Frag Dolls announced the departure of Calyber and Mischief. The team then consisted of Rhoulette, Brookelyn, Seppuku, Valkyrie, Psyche, Pyra, and Phoenix. Rhoulette, Brookelyn, Seppuku, and Valkyrie were the remaining four original Frag Dolls.

In April 2009 the Frag Dolls announced a casting call for one or two new members. Eight finalists were chosen from a group of eighteen semi-finalists based on a public vote, a phone interview, and a competition via Xbox Live on three games: Rainbow Six: Vegas 2, Call of Duty 4, and Halo 3. These eight semi-finalists were flown to Los Angeles for the Electronic Entertainment Expo, where they competed once more. The two winners and newest additions to the team were Fidget and Spectra.

Pyra and Seppuku retired in September 2009. Weeks before E3 2010, the Frag Dolls announced their newest members, SiREN and glitch, who were recruited from the Frag Doll Cadette pool without a casting a call. This act emphasized the benefits of taking part in the Cadette program as interns, and encouraged Frag Doll hopefuls to stay involved and become noticed.

In February 2011, Psyche retired from the team so she could give her full-time job at Ubisoft her full attention.

Furthermore, the Frag Dolls opened another casting call in August 2011, where eleven women, Frag Doll Cadettes, were flown out to San Diego to show their skills in public speaking, crowd interaction, and demoing at Comic Con. Moreover, the finalists were also required to showcase their on-camera interviewing abilities through video submissions on the Frag Dolls YouTube channel. The team announced shortly after the winners and new additions—Sabre and Pixxel.

The Frag Dolls underwent a drastic change when two of their original members, Rhoulette and Brookelyn, retired from the team in September and November 2011. As a result, Valkyrie remained the last original Frag Doll on the team.

However, the Frag Dolls proved they had big plans after the New Year rolled around, and without a casting call, another member from the Frag Doll Cadette pool was hired to the team in January 2012—Cryptik. Valkyrie also announced that the team would be hiring one or two new members before the end of the year.

Shortly after, changes continued to roll around when Jinx announced her retirement after receiving a job at Rooster Teeth in late January 2012. Less than two months later, glitch had also retired from the team, leaving the Frag Dolls with seven members: Cryptik, Fidget, Pixxel, Sabre, SiREN, Spectra, and Valkyrie. Shortly after, Fidget also retires, leaving Frag Dolls down to 6 members.

In August 2012, the Frag Dolls announced the most recent casting call. Instead of pulling from the Frag Doll Cadette pool, they decided to open the casting to the public. The 2 newest members, Daze and Esper were announced in October 2012. Cryptik announced her retirement in October 2012.

On May 29, 2015, Ubisoft announced that Frag Dolls would disband. Frag Dolls founder Morgan Romine said the video game community had "moved on" and that women playing video games was no longer considered unusual or atypical.

=== Activities and goals ===
The Frag Dolls attended industry events and played competitively, both online and offline. The team members have acted as ambassadors of competitive gaming, touring with the Major League Gaming console professional circuit in the 2005 season and the 2007 season. In December 2006, they placed first in the Rainbow Six: Vegas 2 tournament at the Cyberathlete Professional League, making them the first all-female team to win a pro circuit tournament.

The Frag Dolls' mission was to encourage more women to play video games. The team promoted Ubisoft games during interviews and events. Katscratch, Valkyrie, and Rhoulette spoke at the Women's Gaming Conference in Austin, Texas (October 2005) about their role as Frag Dolls, and how they are attempting to reshape the image of female gamers and raise industry awareness of the female market. In February 2006 the Frag Dolls attended the Women in Games International conference in San Francisco, California, speaking on panels and at a roundtable discussion entitled "Women Who Play." They also appeared at the Women in Games International conference in Dallas, Texas (April 2006).

Shortly after the casting of Daze and Esper, the Frag Dolls began preparation to compete in ShootMania Storm and Call of Duty: Black Ops II. The ShootMania Storm team consisted of Esper, Pixxel, and Sabre, with SiREN later joining the competitive roster. They competed at PAX East 2013 for the ShootMania Launch Tournament qualifier, and later Esper competed with High Rollers Gaming at the US$100,000 ShootMania Launch Tournament in San Francisco.

== UK Frag Dolls ==
After the success of the American Frag Dolls, Ubisoft ran a similar recruitment drive in the UK. Five Frag Dolls were selected: Jam, Kitt, Sarin, Voodoo, and Lucky. Lucky left the group shortly after formation due to an increased university workload. Ubisoft never replaced Lucky. Lucky and the UK Frag Dolls had not been established long enough for the loss to have any impact on either the group or the group's fan base. In July 2006 a second Frag Doll, Voodoo, left the team to form a rival group with another female gamer. Ubisoft made no official comment on Voodoo's departure, but announced they intended to recruit two new members to the team.

The group placed its focus on showing that games could be fun, rather than acting as ambassadors for professional gaming, as the original American team had done. The UK Frag Dolls were dissolved on June 30, 2008.

== French Frag Dolls ==
As Ubisoft is a French company, the third territory chosen for the Frag Dolls initiative was France. The French Frag Dolls were Arwen, Katana, L!lie, Meiko, and Mya. L!lie left the team after three months, citing school studies and her desire to focus specifically on Counter-Strike. The group was disbanded in December 2007.

== Frag Doll Cadettes ==
In June 2009 the Frag Dolls announced that they were beginning the Cadette Academy, described as an internship for women who are interested in working in the gaming industry. To date there have been seven classes of Cadettes: Fall 2009 (Aug. 2009 – Feb. 2010), Spring 2010 (Mar. 2010 – Aug. 2010), Fall 2010 (Aug 2010 – Jan 2011), Spring 2011 (Jan 2011 – July 2011), Fall 2011 class (July 2011 – January 2012), Cadette class of 2012 (January 2012 – December 2012), and the Cadette class of 2013 (January 2013 – December 2013).

In January 2012 the Frag Dolls announced that they would be increasing the length of the internship from six months to one year, decreasing the class size to give more individual attention to cadettes (from twelve to eight), and refocusing the Cadette Academy training to include more marketing experiences. The 2012 Cadettes were also tasked with a class project.

The Cadette Academy also serves as a recruitment method for future Frag Dolls. Since the program launched, two of the Fall 2009 Cadette members, Sarah and Krystal, have been promoted to Frag Doll status, and are now known as Glitch and SiREN. In August 2011, Edelita from the Spring 2011 class and Kimberly from the Fall 2010 class were promoted to Frag Dolls, and are now known as Pixxel and Sabre. In October 2012, Sunie_FDC from the 2010 Cadette Class was promoted to Frag Doll status, and is now known as Esper.

== See also ==
- Portrayal of women in video games
