= Ashley Jenkins =

American actress

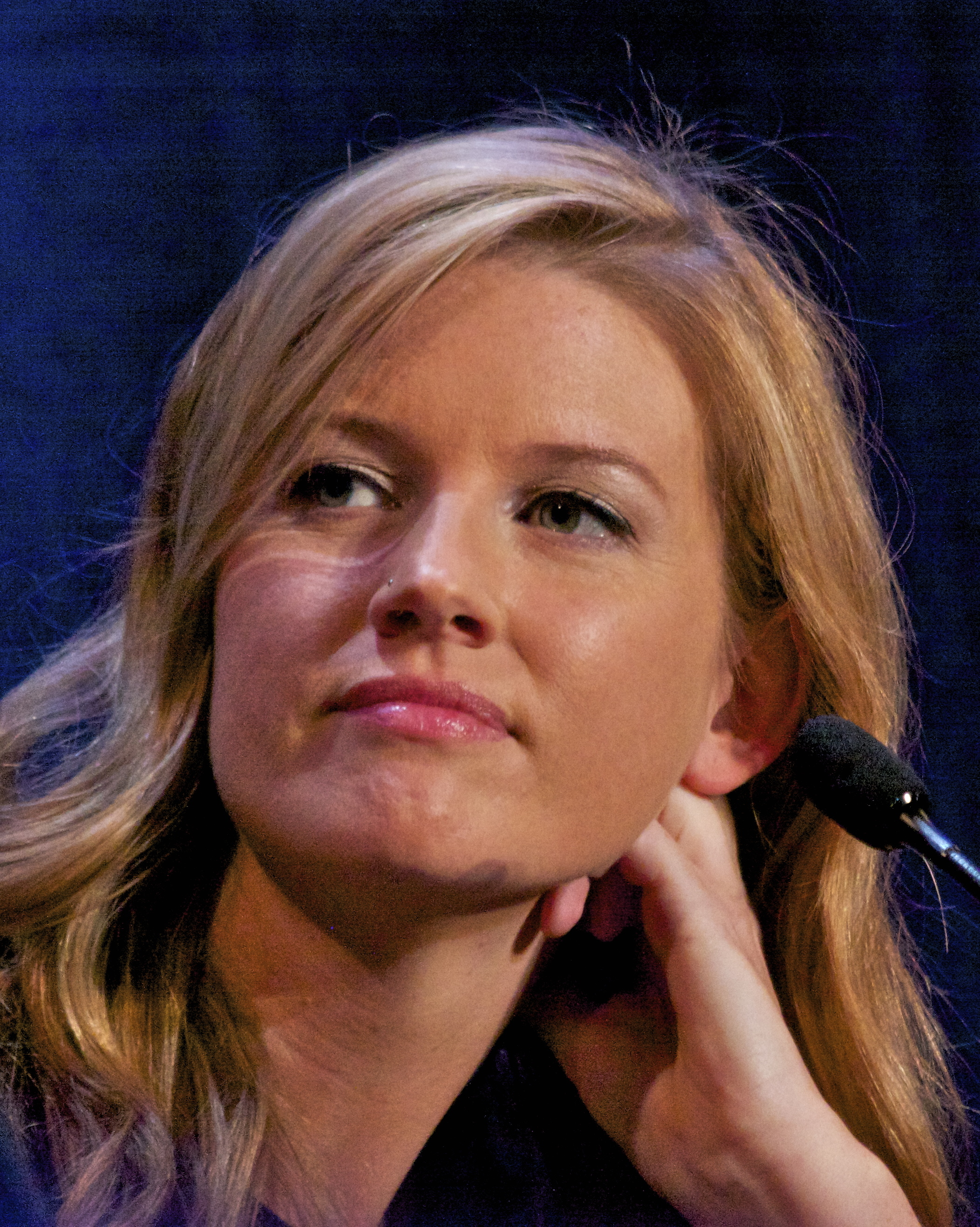
- Jenkins at PAX Prime 2014
- Born: May 3, 1982 (age 44)
- Occupations: Actress; internet personality
- Years active: 2004–present
- Spouse: Burnie Burns (m. 2019)
- Children: 2

Ashley Burns (née Jenkins; born May 3, 1982) is an American actress and internet personality. She is a founding member of Ubisoft's all-female professional gaming group, the Frag Dolls. She founded Rooster Teeth's news division, The Know. She was a contestant on the 28th season of The Amazing Race. Outside of the gaming industry, she voices Coco Adel in RWBY.

== Career ==
Ashley Jenkins began her career in 2004, writing for an MMORPG called Shadowbane. A developer on the game suggested she apply for a position with the Frag Dolls, an all-female, professional gaming team their publisher, Ubisoft, was starting.

She represented the Frag Dolls at many events including Women in Games International and CES. As a professional gamer, Jenkins competed in and promoted games for Ubisoft such as Rainbow Six Vegas, Ghost Recon 2: Summit Strike and Splinter Cell Chaos Theory, in addition to public speaking and representing the team's point of view on women and video games. In 2007, she appeared on the front cover of PC Accelerator magazine.

In 2008, she was hired as Community Manager for Xbox, running social media and Xbox Live interface for Australia and New Zealand.

In 2012, she was hired by IGN as Head of Community and Social Media in San Francisco.

On March 17, 2014, she founded Rooster Teeth's news division, The Know, hosting alongside Meg Turney. In its first two months, the channel amassed over 280,000 subscribers and 9 million video views on YouTube.

In November 2015, it was announced that Jenkins, alongside her boyfriend Burnie Burns, would be competing in the 28th season of The Amazing Race. They finished in 4th place.

In September 2017, alongside Burns, she co-hosted the inaugural Purpose Awards, an expansion from the Streamy Awards.

Jenkins announced on her Twitter on August 30, 2019, that it was her last day at Rooster Teeth.

== Personal life ==
Ashley Jenkins grew up in Ogden, Utah. At 8-years-old, Jenkins was baptized into the Church of Jesus Christ of Latter-day Saints, but has since stated that it was not for her and she is not practicing. She does not consider herself to be a member.

Ashley Jenkins started playing video games when she was seven and received a Nintendo Entertainment System and Super Mario Bros. for Christmas. She considered herself a tomboy.

Jenkins also goes by her gamertag, Jinx. Her favorite game is Psychonauts.

Jenkins became engaged to Rooster Teeth co-founder Burnie Burns in May 2016; they married in June 2019. The couple announced her pregnancy in March 2019; Jenkins gave birth to a boy on August 25, 2019. She announced the birth of their daughter in January 2023.
