= Rooster Teeth =

American entertainment company (2003–2024)

Rooster Teeth Productions, LLC
- Logo from 2010 to 2023
- Trade name: Rooster Teeth
- Type: Subsidiary
- Industry: Entertainment
- Founded: April 1, 2003; 23 years ago
- Founders: Burnie Burns; Matt Hullum; Geoff Ramsey; Jason Saldaña; Gus Sorola; Joel Heyman
- Defunct: May 15, 2024; 2 years ago
- Fate: Closed by Warner Bros. Discovery; brand and certain assets acquired by Box Canyon Productions
- Successor: Box Canyon Productions
- Headquarters: Austin Studios, Austin, Texas, U.S.
- Number of locations: 8 (2018)
- Key people: Jordan Levin (general manager); Matt Hullum (chief content officer); Geoff Ramsey (executive creative director); Barbara Dunkelman (creative director)
- Number of employees: ~150 (March 2024)
- Parent: Warner Bros. Discovery Global Streaming & Interactive Entertainment
- Divisions: Rooster Teeth Animation; Rooster Teeth Games; Rooster Teeth Studios; The Roost Podcast Network
- Website: www.roosterteeth.com

Rooster Teeth Productions, LLC was an American entertainment company headquartered in Austin, Texas. Founded in 2003 by Burnie Burns, Matt Hullum, Geoff Ramsey, Jason Saldaña, Gus Sorola, and Joel Heyman, Rooster Teeth was a subsidiary of Warner Bros. Discovery Global Streaming & Interactive Entertainment, which was a division of Warner Bros. Discovery.

Rooster Teeth's first ever production was Red vs. Blue, which premiered in April 2003; it is the third longest-running episodic web series of all time. Due to server and web hosting costs, the founders created "Sponsorships" which later became "FIRST", a subscription to exclusive and earlier access to content and discounts on their merchandise store, among other benefits. The company later branched out into live-action shorts, series, comedy, Let's Play videos, and full animated productions. Other projects included reality shows, video game development, entertainment news programs, and podcasts. In 2015, Rooster Teeth released its feature-film debut Lazer Team, a science-fiction action comedy. The company hosted an annual convention, RTX, from 2011 to 2023 in Austin, Texas, and additionally in Sydney and London.

The company's videos were regularly released on its own website and app while podcasts and Let's Plays were published on their YouTube channel as well. As of September 2021, Rooster Teeth's primary YouTube channel has 9.18 million subscribers and has over 6 billion video views. Including all of their other channels, they maintain over 45 million subscribers.

On March 6, 2024, Rooster Teeth announced that the company would shut down. On April 15, 2024, Rooster Teeth announced that both the First program and their website and apps would shut down on May 15, 2024. On February 5, 2025, Burns acquired and relaunched the Rooster Teeth brand and some of its remaining intellectual property through his company Box Canyon Productions.

== History ==
Rooster Teeth's second logo (2023–2024)

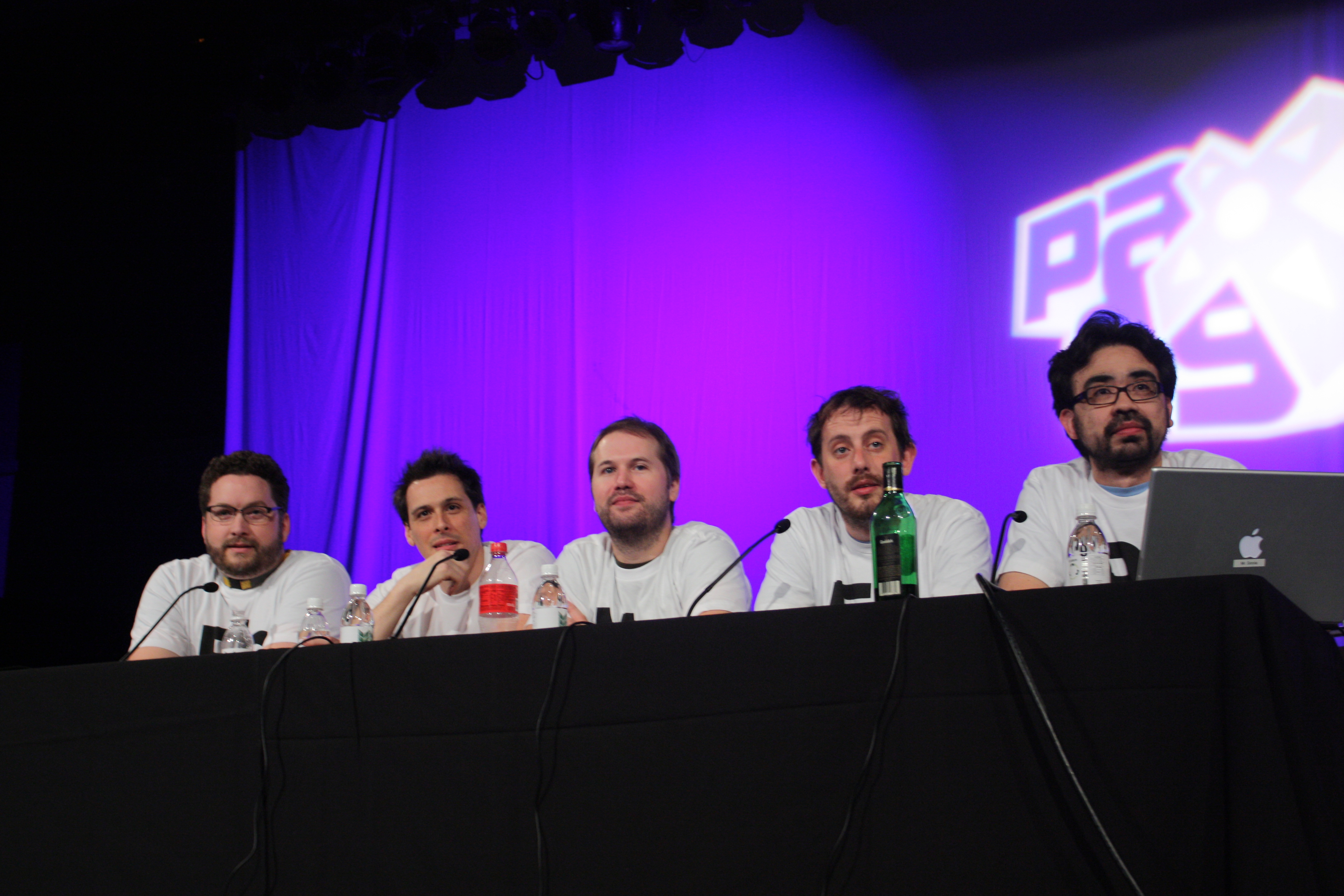
Rooster Teeth founders Burnie Burns, Joel Heyman, Matt Hullum, Geoff Ramsey, and Gus Sorola at PAX 2009

While attending the University of Texas at Austin, Burnie Burns and Matt Hullum collaborated with actor Joel Heyman making The Schedule, a 1997 independent film. The movie helped Hullum and Heyman to find work in Los Angeles, but otherwise had limited success. While working for a local company named Telenetwork, Burns later met Geoff Ramsey (then named Geoff Fink), Gustavo Sorola, Dan Godwin, and Jason Saldaña; the five formed drunkgamers.com, a website where they reviewed various video games while drunk. According to Ramsey, the group tried to receive free games to review, but "incurred the wrath" of several game developers in doing so.

One of the non-gameplay videos that the drunkgamers crew created during this time was a live-action parody of the Apple Switch ad campaign. This video featured Sorola as the main actor, used Peter Tchaikovsky's "Dance of the Sugar Plum Fairy" as background music, and focused on the lack of games available for the Apple Macintosh computer. Sorola and Burns said that the name was changed from 'Drunk Tank Podcast' to 'Rooster Teeth Podcast' for the same reason that 'Drunk Gamers' was changed to 'Rooster Teeth': Nobody would give games or sponsor something with 'drunk' in the title "because it was so unprofessional". Burns said of the name change, "We named it something else to give people the idea that we were going to be doing more than that." The name "Rooster Teeth" is a euphemism for "cockbite", an insult from the original Red vs. Blue trailer that Burns described as a "touchstone for the audience".

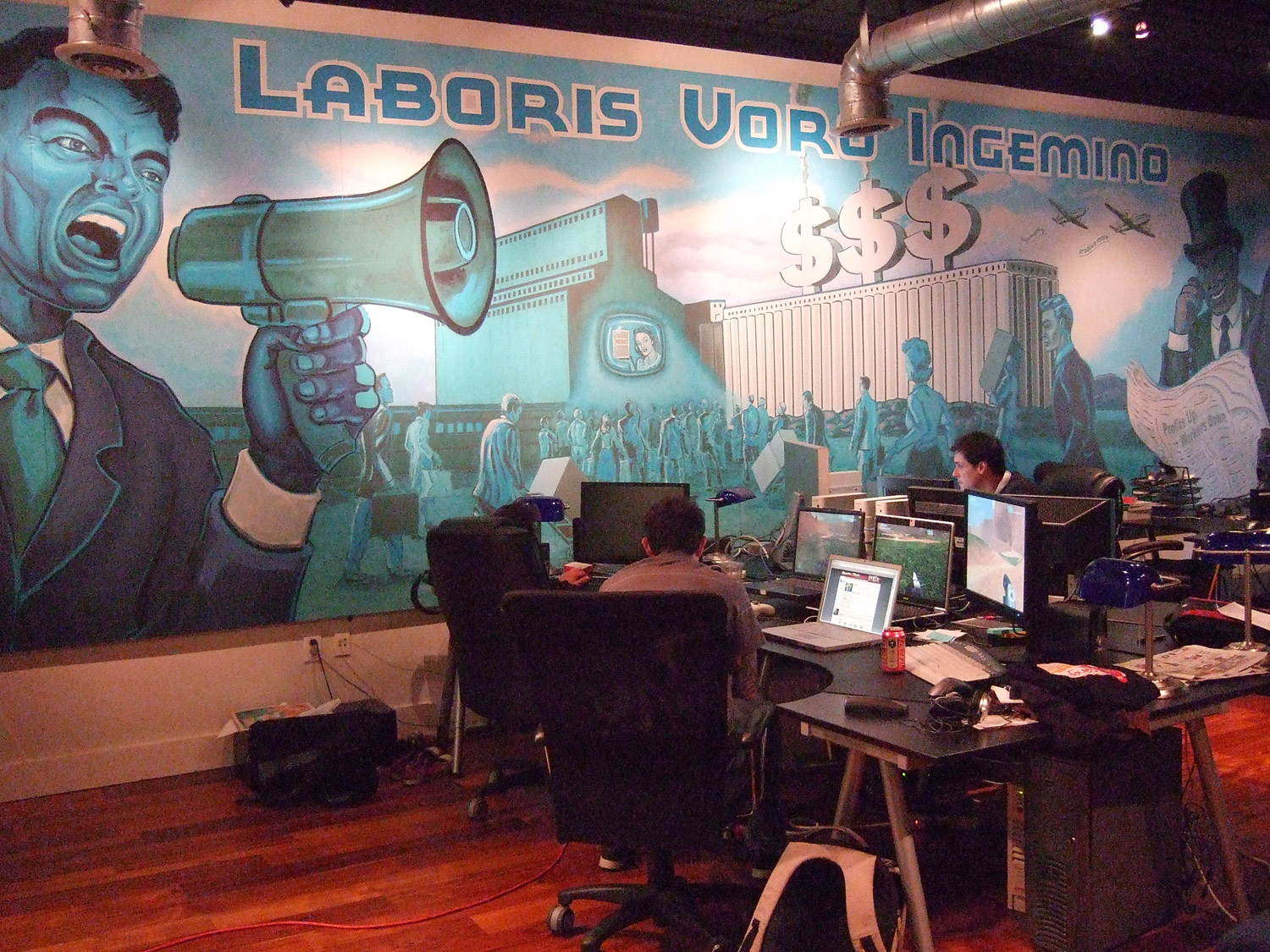
Rooster Teeth's office on Congress Street in Austin in 2008

Among the company's core philosophies, Burns said, "we only make content that we would want to see... it comes from a very genuine space. I think that our audience appreciates that voice". As of 2017, production costs for an episode vary from $15,000 to $100,000.

Rooster Teeth's business strategy was a hybrid model composed of subscriptions, preroll ads, YouTube preroll ads, licensed studio productions, branded merchandise, and annual live events.

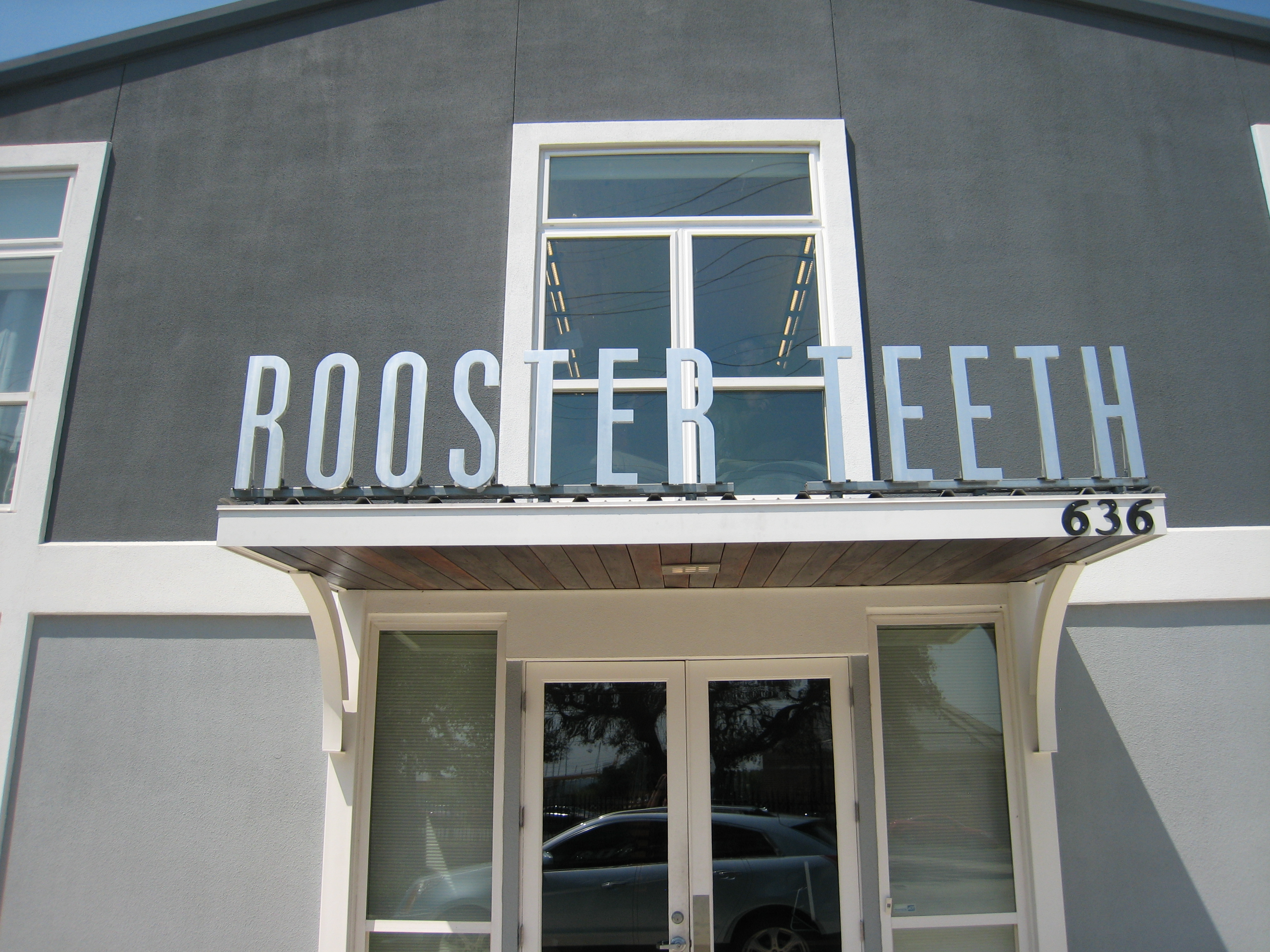
Rooster Teeth's "636" studio, their primary office from 2011 through 2014

Rooster Teeth has attributed their success to maintaining their community site and was reluctant to join YouTube initially, stating they viewed them as a "competitor". In 2014, having signed a two-year lease, the entire company (then consisting of over 90 employees) moved into Stage 5 at Austin Studios.

=== Acquisition by Fullscreen ===
In November 2014, Rooster Teeth was acquired by Fullscreen for an undisclosed amount. Rooster Teeth agreed to be bought to give itself "the resources and tools" needed to compete against other producers. Burns elaborated by saying they considered Netflix, HBO, and Amazon to be their current rivals of competition. On February 3, 2015, Burns confirmed that Rooster Teeth would be establishing an office in Los Angeles. These offices were used by a whole new division, Funhaus. The company released their feature film debut in 2015 with Lazer Team, a science fiction comedy.

In 2016, Rooster Teeth hired three content executives to help with audience expansion: Luis Medina as senior VP of Partnerships, Evan Bregman as Director of Programming and Ryan P. Hall as Head of Development. It was announced that Medina would co-manage the Let's Play family with Ramsey, including Achievement Hunter, Funhaus, and ScrewAttack, and manage partnerships with third-party brands such as Cow Chop and Kinda Funny. Bregman will be responsible for programming strategy and boosting growth across all platforms such as apps, the community site, YouTube, and Facebook. Hall will oversee Rooster Teeth's development slate and lead efforts to identify up-and-coming projects and talent.

Each year, the company participated in Extra Life, a gaming-themed fundraiser with Rooster Teeth's proceeds going to Dell Children's Medical Center of Central Texas. During their 2017 Extra Life stream, they raised a total of US$1,209,970.73. The 2018 Extra Life stream raised US$1,417,288 for Extra Life and Dell Children's Medical Center. The 2019 Extra Life stream raised US$1,222,371. Due to the COVID-19 pandemic, Rooster Teeth shortened the 2020 stream to 12 hours. It raised a total of US$1,163,801 for Dell Children's Medical Center.

On January 26, 2018, Fullscreen President and former COO Ezra Cooperstein was appointed as President of Rooster Teeth.

In May 2018, Rooster Teeth piloted five shows named Branded, Gorq's Quest, Achievement Haunter, Million Dollars, But ... Animated, and Rooster Teeth's Murder Room, and also announced Spikeface, a new 2D/dark comedy show to be coproduced with Rob McElhenney and his RCG Productions.

=== Under Otter Media ===
In December 2018, Otter Media restructured Fullscreen, consolidating Rooster Teeth, along with Crunchyroll and VRV, under Ellation. The companies were to align sales efforts to attract advertising and partnerships. During the transition, Otter Media CEO Tony Goncalves highlighted the foundation of increased programming quality at Rooster Teeth, pledging changes to the company would be minimal in order to preserve the brand. Machinima was to be subsumed into Fullscreen.

On December 18, 2018, Rooster Teeth added to their overall content library by partnering with animation channels CypherDen and Flashgitz, premiering their future content on Rooster Teeth First.

=== Under WarnerMedia ===
On January 31, 2019, Yvonne Secretan, COO of Rooster Teeth, announced her retirement. Ezra Cooperstein stepped down as President of Rooster Teeth on April 26, 2019. On September 12, 2019, Hullum announced Rooster Teeth had laid off 13% of its workforce, approximately 50 employees. Two weeks after announcing the layoffs, Jordan Levin was named general manager with most of Rooster Teeth's founders stepping down into creative roles: Matt Hullum stepped down as CEO and became Chief Content Officer, Burnie Burns stepped down as chief creative officer to executive producer and Geoff Ramsey became executive creative director.

In December 2019, Rooster Teeth promoted Doreen Copeland to VP, Head of Production, and Joe Clary and Sean Hinz to Co-Heads of Animation, leading day-to-day operations across all of Rooster Teeth's animated productions; Clary and Hinz will report to Copeland, who will oversee all physical production. In June 2020, Heyman said that he was "laid off" from Rooster Teeth and would no longer perform in Red vs. Blue. Burns resigned in June 2020, maintaining a first-look deal with Rooster Teeth.

In August 2020, Rooster Teeth announced it was reviewing its online content library as part of a diversity initiative.

In April 2021, it was reported that AT&T was looking to sell Rooster Teeth and that the company's revenue had dropped nearly $20 million in 2019. However, no such sale occurred and the company was included in the completed merger that formed Warner Bros. Discovery in April 2022.

In the month before, Rooster Teeth and WarnerMedia Access announced the creation of the Rooster Teeth Digital Creators Program, which is intended to support underrepresented talent.

=== 20th anniversary ===
On April 1, 2023, the company turned 20 years old and as part of celebrations, Rooster Teeth ran a 20-week campaign—bringing back "deep cuts, one-off episodes and fan favorites every week" according to Matt Hullum, leading up to a big finale at the 2023 RTX Convention taking place July 7–9 in Austin. As part of its twentieth year, the company rebranded, changing its logo from a rooster icon and a wind-up set of novelty teeth to a stylized "R" with the appearance of a rooster and changing to a red and blue color scheme from the original red and black. The company's new slogan is "Just Playing".

=== Closure ===
On March 6, 2024, general manager Jordan Levin notified employees that the company would close over the next several months. In an email, he cited reasons for the shutdown including "fundamental shifts in consumer behavior and monetization across platforms, advertising, and patronage", with it being reported that the number of subscribers to Rooster Teeth's "First" service had dropped to around one-quarter of their peak and that Rooster Teeth as a whole had been unprofitable for a decade. While the Roost Podcast Network planned to remain in operation while Warner Bros. Discovery sought a buyer, Warner also gauged interest in Rooster Teeth's intellectual property, including RWBY, Red vs. Blue and Gen:Lock. In April 2024, The Roost Podcast Network would be sold to the talent management company Night, and in July 2024, the RWBY franchise would be sold to Viz Media.

Some employees continued working in order to finalize the shutdown and, for a time, it remained unclear when the company would close entirely. Most employees left on May 10, 2024, with the website updated to a final goodbye message on May 15, 2024. Following the closure, several of the former talent and staff members from Rooster Teeth continued to work together in new ventures.

=== Legacy ===
On February 5, 2025, Burns announced he had acquired the Rooster Teeth brand and some of its remaining intellectual property through his company Box Canyon Productions. Some Rooster Teeth productions are set to return, alongside a "reimagining" of Burns' first film, The Schedule, and a new audio adventure, Again. On August 7, after a period of being in open beta, the website relaunched, as announced on Burns' podcast Morning Somewhere.

== Productions ==
=== Rooster Teeth Animation ===
Rooster Teeth Animation was a division of Rooster Teeth that was founded in 2014, with Gray Haddock as the head of the department. On December 13, 2019, it was announced that Joe Clary and Sean Hinz were promoted to co-heads of the department to replace Haddock.

==== Red vs. Blue ====
In a parody of science-fiction films and games, and of military life, Red vs. Blue tells the story of two groups of soldiers fighting a civil war in a desolate and isolated box canyon. Initially, Rooster Teeth expected the series to consist of only six to eight episodes. However, the series quickly became very popular, receiving 20,000 downloads in a single day, which contributed to bringing Rooster Teeth to fame. Accordingly, Burns conceived an extension of the plot.

==== RWBY ====
RWBY (pronounced "Ruby") is an anime-styled CG-animated web series that was created and directed by animator Monty Oum, and written by Miles Luna and Kerry Shawcross. The first episode of RWBY premiered on July 5, 2013, at RTX 2013 and was released on the Rooster Teeth site on July 18, 2013. The story takes place in the world of Remnant, which is filled with supernatural forces and shadowy creatures known as the "Creatures of Grimm". Prior to the events of the series, mankind waged a battle of survival against the Grimm before discovering the power of a mysterious element called Dust, which allowed them to fight back against the monsters. On February 1, 2015, Oum died due to a severe allergic reaction during a medical procedure, but the series he created continues. The success of RWBY also resulted in a secondary series by Rooster Teeth, RWBY Chibi, which features the show's main characters in chibi form, with a focus on comedic elements and humor.

In July 2024, the RWBY franchise was purchased by Viz Media, who stated their intentions to continue the main web series along with RWBY showrunner and former Rooster Teeth employee Kerry Shawcross. They also stated their intentions to produce RWBY merchandise and search for ways to widely distribute the series via streaming platforms and home video releases.

==== Rooster Teeth Animated Adventures ====
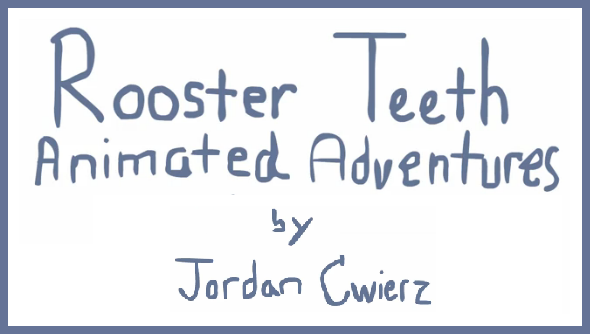
RTAA title card

In July 2010, Jordan Cwierz released the first Rooster Teeth Animated Adventures (RTAA) episode (then known as Drunk Tank Animated Adventures), featuring animations depicting stories told on the Rooster Teeth Podcast. In October 2011, Cwierz was officially hired to produce the animated shorts full-time as a feature of the podcast.

On October 8, 2014, Rooster Teeth debuted Let's Play Minimations. It features highlights from Achievement Hunter's Let's Plays, initially using 3D animation that resembles the sandbox game, Minecraft and later machinimated using Grand Theft Auto V.

==== Camp Camp ====
The first episode of Camp Camp

On April 1, 2016, Rooster Teeth announced Camp Camp with a trailer that aired on their website and YouTube. The series premiered on June 10, 2016, as part of Rooster Teeth's Summer of Animation promotion. It focuses on a young boy named Max, voiced by Michael Jones, who is forced to go to summer camp but makes two friends there who help him constantly torment their camp counselor, David, voiced by Miles Luna. It airs on Fridays for Rooster Teeth First members and Saturdays for site members. The show was created by Jordan Cwierz and Miles Luna. The first season was extended by two episodes due to positive reception, for a total of 12 episodes in its first season. Camp Camp's composer was Benjamin Zecker, with Miles Luna writing the outlines for "The Camp Camp Theme Song Song" and "Better Than You". The DVD/Blu-ray combo pack of the first two seasons were released on May 22, 2018, with its third season premiered on May 25. Its fourth season announced on May 20, 2019, and premiered on the Rooster Teeth site on June 1, 2019. On July 7, 2023, at Rooster Teeth's annual convention RTX, it was announced that Camp Camp would return with new episodes on March 1, 2024.

==== gen:LOCK ====
At RTX Austin 2017, Rooster Teeth Animation announced that they would be making a new series called gen:LOCK that is a mecha action drama series by RWBY producer, Gray G. Haddock. It was teased at New York Comic Con and RTX London. It was originally set for a late 2018 release, but was pushed back to January 2019. On May 21, 2018, it was revealed that the main character, Julian Chase, is voiced by Michael B. Jordan. Jordan co-produced the series through his production company, Outlier Society Productions. The series premiered on January 26, 2019. The first season concluded on March 9, 2019.

On October 24, 2019, the series was renewed for a second season, which premiered first on HBO Max on November 4, 2021, and concluded on December 23.

==== Others ====
In May 2004, at the E3 gaming convention, Rooster Teeth was introduced to The Sims 2 and realized that the game would be suitable for a series that parodied reality television. The game's publisher Electronic Arts allowed them to continue with the project. The result was The Strangerhood, a comedy series that centers on eight strangers who awake one day unaware of where they are or how they arrived there. Its first season of 17 episodes completed on April 27, 2006. In 2005, the group collaborated with Paul Marino on Strangerhood Studios, a spin-off commissioned by the Independent Film Channel. This spin-off was the first machinima series to be commissioned for broadcast and won an award for Best Editing at the 2005 Machinima Film Festival. The second season premiered on September 29, 2015, after the stretch goal was reached for Lazer Team's Indiegogo crowdfunding campaign.

In 2006, Rooster Teeth partnered with Maybeck Productions to create PANICS, a short series filmed on F.E.A.R. that chronicles the misadventures of Bravo Team, a group of soldiers sent to investigate a paranormal disturbance. The four publicly released episodes were released between September 27, 2005, and October 18, 2005, and a prequel was released with F.E.A.R. – Director's Edition. The mini-series won an award for Best Writing at the 2005 Machinima Film Festival. Rooster Teeth's other machinima productions are 1-800-Magic, a four-episode mini-series created in 2006 using the game Shadowrun, and Supreme Surrender, a 2008 mini-series made using Supreme Commander. On February 13, 2017, Rooster Teeth premiered the teaser trailer for their upcoming animated series titled Sex Swing featuring members of their Funhaus division based on a recurring joke in their videos where they portray a fictional band of the same name.

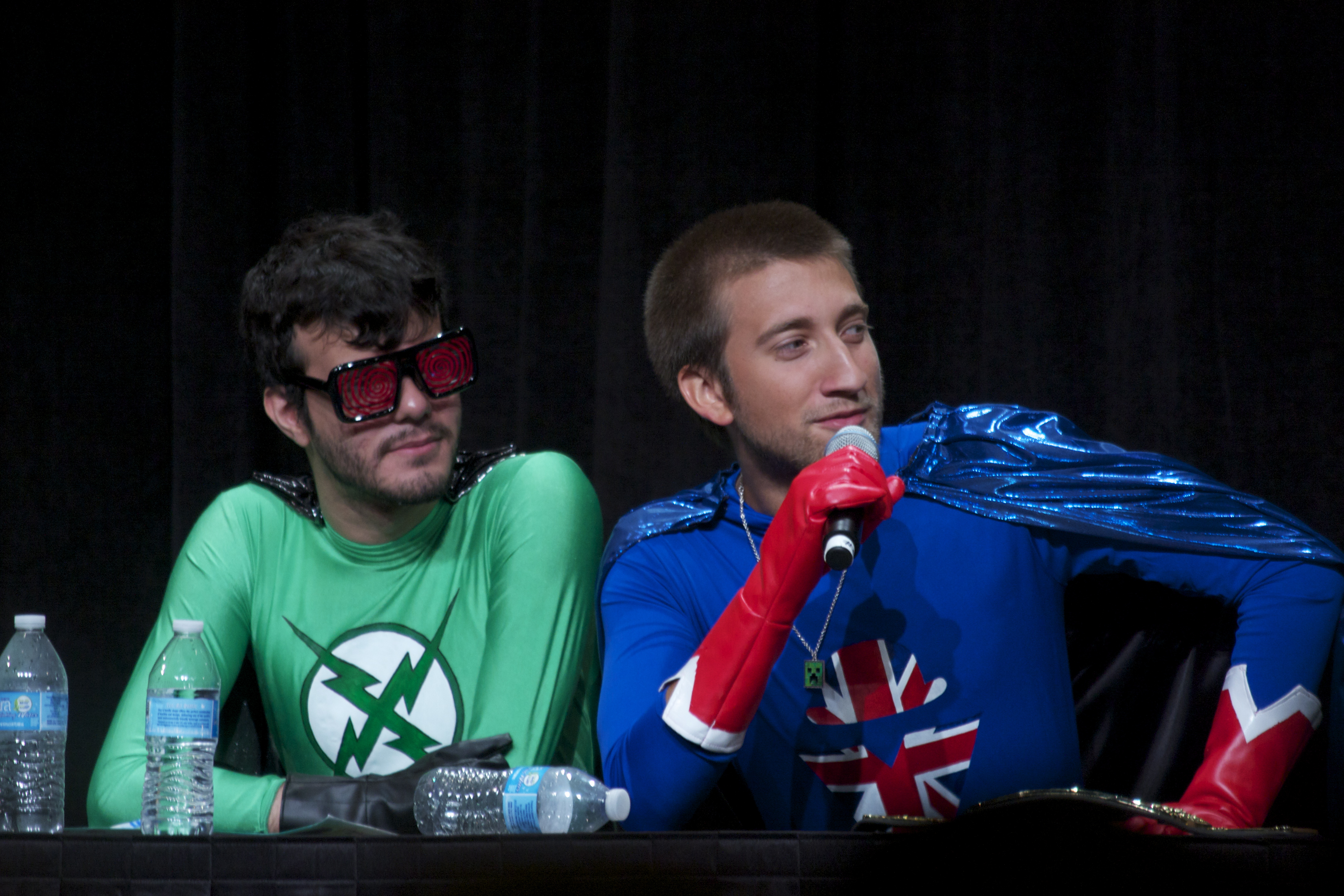
Ray Narvaez Jr. and Gavin Free cosplaying as X-Ray and Vav

At RTX 2014, a new animated show called X-Ray and Vav was announced, starring Ray Narvaez Jr. as X-Ray and Gavin Free as Vav. The show is directed by Lindsay Jones (who also voices Hilda) and Jordan Cwierz, with art direction by Patrick Rodriguez. The first episode was released on November 27, 2014. The second season premiered on July 19, 2015. Narvaez and Free reprised their roles as the show's titular heroes, with the addition of Michael Jones as the anti-hero Mogar, Jessica DiCicco as news reporter Ash Samaya, and Ryan Haywood as The Mad King. When asked by a fan if he would return for a third season if asked, Narvaez stated, "Not interested. I am happy with how Season 2 ended, plus as fun as voice acting was I have no interest in doing it anymore."

A new 2D animation show was released on Rooster Teeth First on March 16, 2018. Created by Georden Whitman, Nomad of Nowhere is a western-fantasy hybrid focused on a mute wanderer hunted for being capable of using magic to give life to inanimate objects.

On February 15, 2019, it was announced Rooster Teeth would partner with Hasbro for a 2020 animated Netflix series based on the Transformers: War for Cybertron Trilogy toyline.

=== Live-action production ===
==== Rooster Teeth Shorts ====
Rooster Teeth first ventured into live action in 2009 with Captain Dynamic, a mini-series to promote the online game City of Heroes. The series tells the story of a team of writers hired to use the new in-game content creation tools to promote the title character, Captain Dynamic, the 'worst superhero in the world'. Directed by Matt Hullum and written by Burnie Burns, the series starred Ed Robertson of the Barenaked Ladies, who is a long time friend and fan of Rooster Teeth. A number of Rooster Teeth employees were present throughout the series, notably Joel Heyman as Captain Dynamic's primary writer. Actor Shannon McCormick appears as the series' antagonist, Great Face. The series also led to the release of an iPhone app called the Awesome Button.

Following the positive reception of Captain Dynamic, Rooster Teeth began producing another live-action series, Rooster Teeth Shorts, a sketch comedy which parodies life at their offices in a similar fashion to the webcomic. The series features the staff of Rooster Teeth, who all play caricatures of themselves, as well as occasional appearances from voice actors from some of their machinima series. The first season ran for twenty episodes, which along with Captain Dynamic has been released on DVD.

The second season of RT Shorts debuted on April 23, 2010, with new episodes released weekly via the Rooster Teeth website until a hiatus during late July 2010, during which the team focused all their efforts towards Red vs. Blue episodes. With production on Red vs. Blue complete, weekly RT Shorts episodes began again on August 28, 2010, until the second season's conclusion with its twenty-fourth episode and DVD release in early December. Shortly before season two's conclusion, Rooster Teeth collaborated with the team behind Mega64, a video game-centered comedy series. Together they produced four Rooster Teeth Shorts episodes, which were released on the Rooster Teeth website as the beginning of season three.

Halfway through season four, Burns announced the cancellation of Rooster Teeth Shorts for several new series. However, on April 1, 2013, Rooster Teeth announced Rooster Teeth Shorts would return with a fifth season, on the same day, the season premiere episode Reunion was released and marked the tenth anniversary of the company.

On August 22, 2013, Rooster Teeth released six 6-second mini-episodes exclusively through the video sharing service Vine. Six more were published on September 13, 2013. The third set was released on October 11, 2013, followed by a fourth set on November 8, 2013.

==== Immersion ====
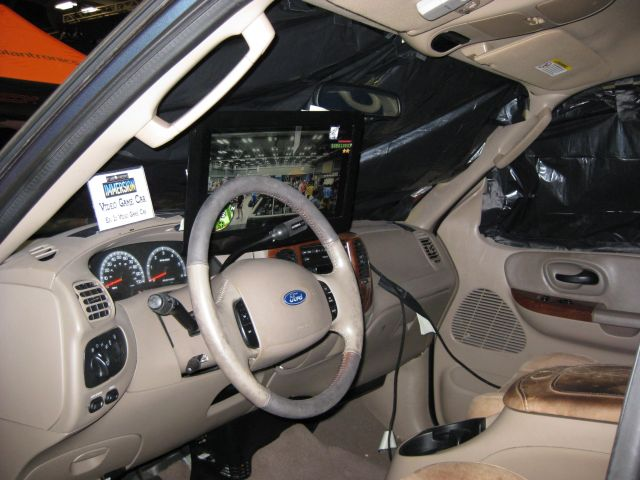
A car with a blacked out windshield and a video screen, used to test driving a car with a third-person perspective in the Immersion pilot

Immersion is a web series in which Burnie Burns and Gus Sorola (Griffon Ramsey in the first season) test the concepts of video games in real life, such as whether the heckling that sometimes occurs in multiplayer video games would negatively affect the performance of real soldiers. Burns joked in the Rooster Teeth podcast that the series started as an "elaborate way for [them] to do fun stuff and get paid for it". Geoff Ramsey and Gus Sorola were the test subjects throughout the first season. Gavin Free and Michael Jones served as the test subjects from the second season onwards. Various other Rooster Teeth employees have served as test subjects in certain episodes including Miles Luna, Kerry Shawcross, Blaine Gibson and Chris Demarais.

During PAX East in late March 2010, Rooster Teeth released a teaser trailer for a series with a pilot episode that tested how easy it would be to drive a car from a third-person perspective. Nothing was mentioned of Immersion until October 2010, when Burnie Burns stated during the company's podcast, The Rooster Teeth Podcast, that production had begun on further episodes.

Soon after, on November 23, 2010, the company released pictures on Reddit of a door in their office turned into a safe-room door from the video game Left 4 Dead to build hype for the series' debut the following day. The post became the most popular post of the day on Reddit. Rooster Teeth re-released a tweaked pilot episode the following day to begin the weekly series, which concluded with its seventh episode on January 5, 2011.

A new episode of Immersion premiered on June 17, 2011, after five months on hiatus. The episode's filming took place on May 29, 2011, during Rooster Teeth's convention, RTX, as well as 400 participants dressed as zombies. The episode shows Geoff Ramsey and Gus Sorola defending themselves from a horde of zombies.

On June 17, Burns said during a panel at Supanova Sydney, that they would be producing a second season, and they were developing concepts. They also confirmed that Gavin Free and Michael Jones of Achievement Hunter would be joining the cast in the second season, replacing Sorola and Ramsey as the test subjects. In the Rooster Teeth Podcast, it was confirmed that the second season began production in 2013. Burns stated in an episode of the Rooster Teeth Podcast that several television stations were interested in picking up the series for its second season.

During RTX 2015, Burns announced that there would be a third season of Immersion. The third season premiered in November 2015. Airing on August 3, 2019, Burns, Free, and Jones did an episode of Immersion for Discovery channel's Shark Week. Along with being shown a demonstration of mechanical shark jaws, it involved them riding a mechanical shark, surfing on the back of a shark-like boat, and ultimately ended with both of them diving with sharks with shark expert Luke Tipple. The episode is available to watch on the Discovery website.

==== The Slow Mo Guys ====
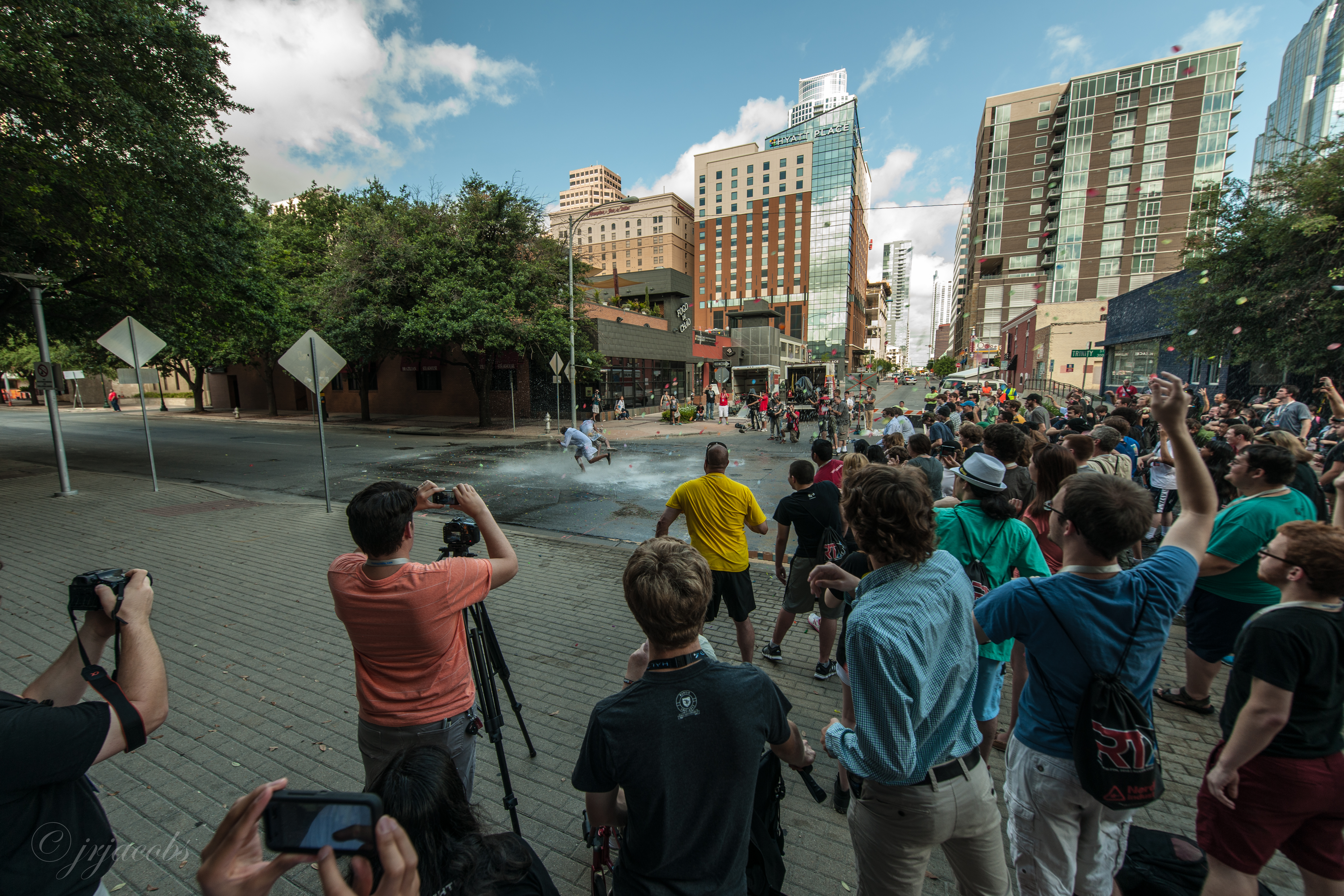
Attendees of RTX 2013 pelting The Slow Mo Guys hosts with water balloons for a slow motion video

The Slow Mo Guys is a science and technology entertainment web series from Thame, England, United Kingdom created by Gavin Free, starring himself and Daniel Gruchy. The series consists of a wide variety of things filmed in extreme slow motion using a range of Vision Research Phantom high-speed cameras, capable of shooting over 1,500,000 frames per second. The series premiered on October 15, 2010. On February 20, 2013, Free confirmed that the series had been picked up by Rooster Teeth and that further episodes of the series would be released on Rooster Teeth's website, as well as the series' existing YouTube channel. A best of compilation episode was released by Rooster Teeth Productions for home video on September 10, 2013.

==== Day 5 ====
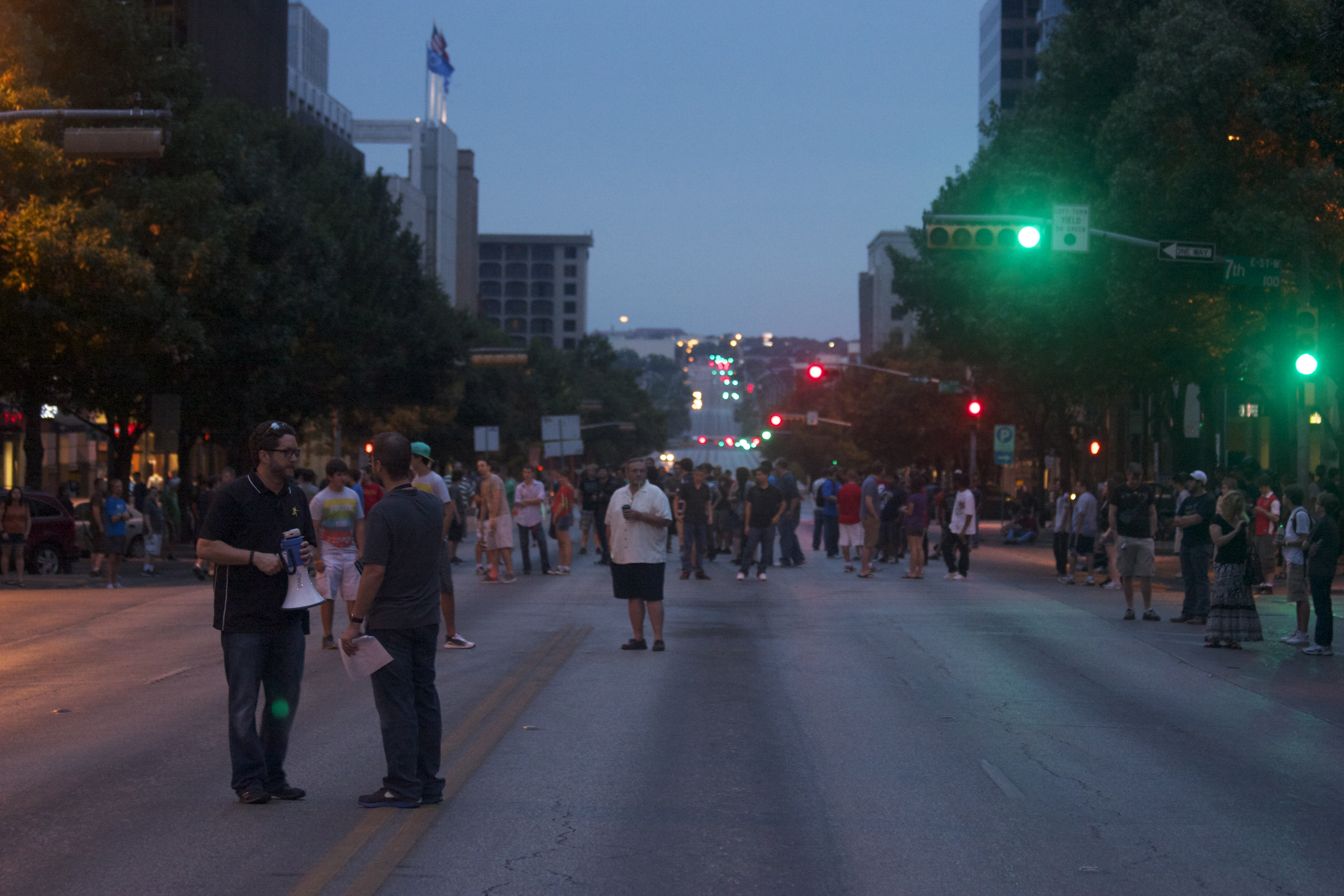
Shooting of a scene in Day 5 in downtown Austin during RTX 2012

At RTX 2012, 1,800 fans were used as extras for a scene in post-apocalypse short series called Day 5, which initially followed a man fighting to stay awake after a virus spreads that causes anyone who falls asleep to die. The trailer premiered at RTX 2014. While the premise was kept the same, the overall story and characters were later changed drastically. In March 2016, the cast was announced, with filming starting that same month. The first episode premiered on June 19, 2016, on both Rooster Teeth's website and YouTube, though the rest of the series was released exclusively on Rooster Teeth's website for FIRST members, making it the company's first premium exclusive show. Its first season concluded on July 31, 2016. Showrunner Josh Flanagan held a Reddit AMA the following day, answering many fan questions about the show. In February 2017, a second season of the show was announced, along with a second season of Camp Camp.

==== Million Dollars, But ... ====
Million Dollars, But ... is an ongoing series in which three Rooster Teeth employees or a special guest each come up with a typically difficult scenario—which the cast comically re-enact—as a condition for which they will be given a million dollars; for example, the person has to date Adolf Hitler for a year. The early episodes usually featured Burnie Burns, Gavin Free, and Barbara Dunkelman, but as time went on, the cast became more varied. The pilot episode premiered on May 21, 2015, with the series continuing on July 9, 2015. The series now features special episodes devoted to specific themes, such as animation, with all the scenarios revolving around animation. Million Dollars, But ... has developed a card game that had a very successful Kickstarter, reaching their goal of US$10,000 within 2 minutes and later surpassing $1 million. The card game was released in mid-June 2016.

==== On the Spot ====
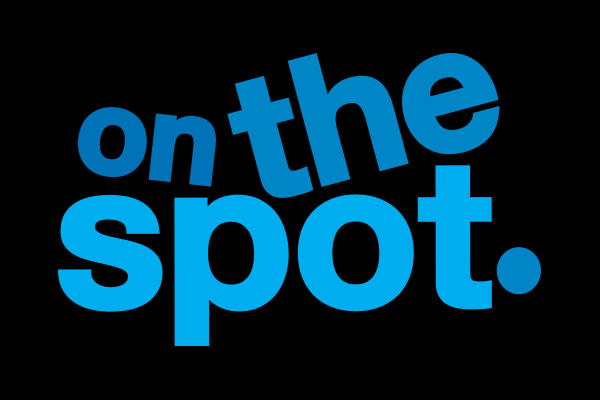
On the Spot logo

On the Spot is the name of the Rooster Teeth game show that involves members of the Rooster Teeth cast and crew, split into two teams of two people, playing various improvisational games to gain points awarded by the host Jon Risinger. The winning team is awarded a golden trophy that resembles Gustavo Sorola, affectionately called "The Golden Gus". Although promised to the winner, after being broken several times, the trophy now does not leave Risinger's desk. A frequent theme of the show is the chaotic humor; contestants will frequently attempt to annoy and antagonize Risinger, and to mock his show. The points are assigned arbitrarily and inconsistently based on the random whim of the host, as well as being assigned by the broadcast team that is running the show. In an effort to bring variety to the show, the next few seasons have been themed, with the first themed season being "On the Spot goes to Hell!", where Jon, his show, and his contestants go to hell because his show was too bad. The second themed season is "On the Spot: Lost in Time" with each episode being set in a different time period due to a break in the space-time continuum caused by Chris Demarais. The third themed season involves a "family friendly" version of the show titled "On the Spot: The Happy Room", where each episode has a learning subject such as weather or family which the game prompts are based on. The latest themed season, "On the Spot and Chill", has a TV show theme.

=== Commercial and external partners ===
In 2014, a bi-weekly series premiered called Happy Hour. The series chronicles the drunken adventures of Geoff Ramsey, Gavin Free, and Griffon Ramsey. The series ended on September 24, 2017.

Created to test elaborate social experiments, Social Disorder follows Chris Demarais and Aaron Marquis as they compete for points as a game show. The first episode, The Body Bag Experiment, debuted on September 15, 2014, in which Demarais and Marquis had to drag each other around in a body bag trying to get bystanders to help them out. Points were awarded for making up reasons as to what was in the bag or why they were dragging the bag in the first place.

Crunch Time was a web series that initially aired in September 2016. The original trailer was featured on The Nerdist's announcement article, and depicted university students creating a machine to allow them to enter other people's dreams. The show stars Samm Levine, known for Freaks and Geeks and Inglourious Basterds, as well as Good Neighbor's Nick Rutherford; it also starred Jessy Hodges and Kirk C. Johnson, who starred in Rooster Teeth's first feature film, Lazer Team. Supporting the main cast is comedian Brent Morin and True Detective's Michael Hyatt as agents Hobbs and Mullins, respectively.

On Halloween 2012, a partnership between Rooster Teeth and Blip was announced, with the premiere of their new 10-episode, reality game competition series sponsored by GEICO. The Gauntlet followed gamers from around the United States competing in contests of skills, concentration, agility and stamina, inspired by reality competitions Wipeout and The Voice. The first season was hosted by Ali Baker and Burnie Burns. Season two was hosted by Burns and Joel Heyman and began on September 7, 2013.

Starting in 2014, Rooster Teeth employees Miles Luna and Kyle Taylor started playing video games and recording the gameplay and facial camera footage to create a show originally called Sponsor Play. The show was featured as part of the Sponsor Cut portion of the RT website as an incentive to become a sponsor for their production. This series was renamed to Backwardz Compatible in November 2016 along with the change of sponsorship format. The series included gameplay of the original Fatal Frame, Resident Evil 7, Sonic Adventure 2, Alien: Isolation, Dark Souls III, and others.

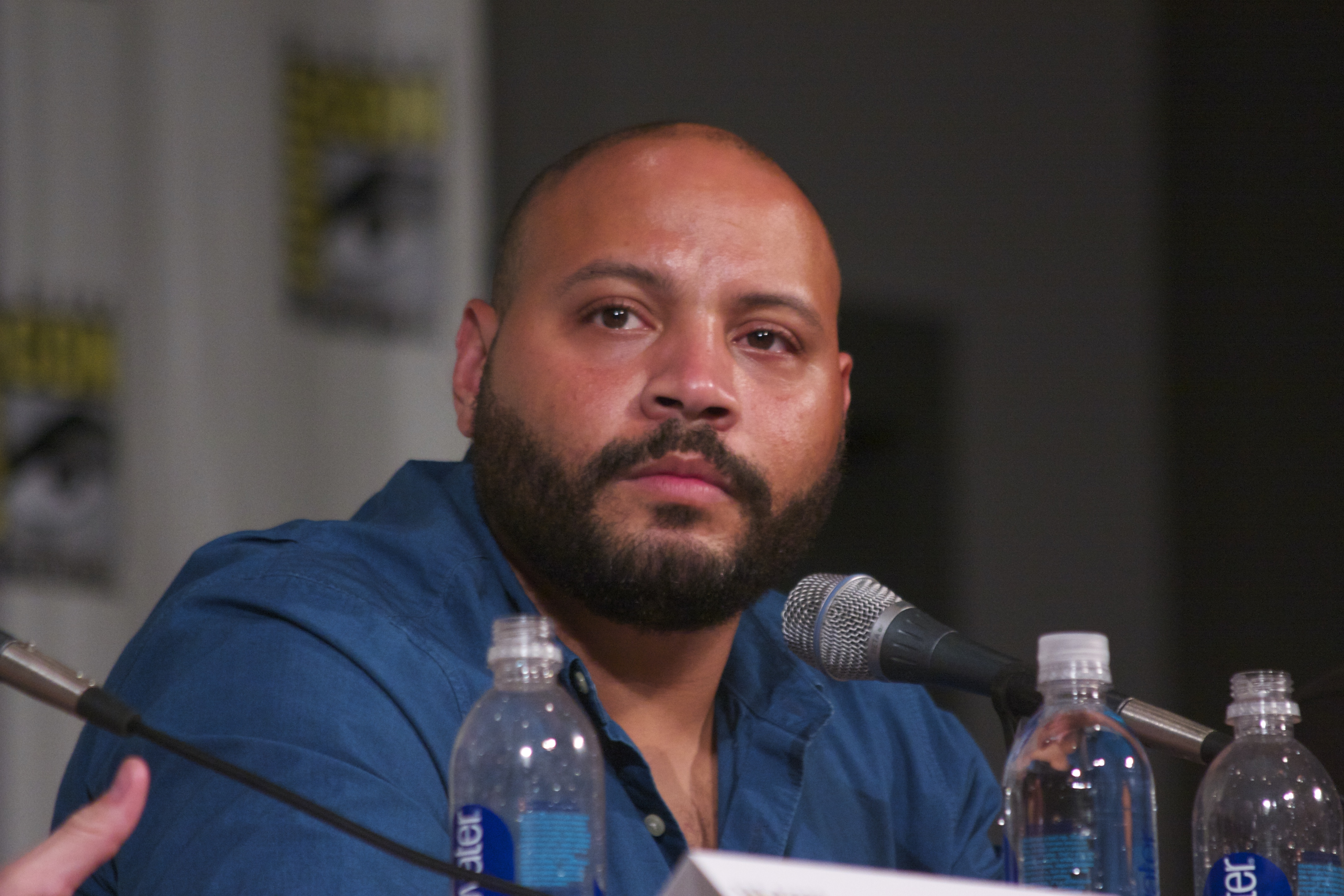
Colton Dunn, host of RT-ES

On September 27, 2015, a sketch comedy show RT-ES, or Rooster Teeth Entertainment System, premiered for Rooster Teeth First members on roosterteeth.com. The show was produced in Los Angeles, California and was hosted and created by Colton Dunn. The show consisted of Dunn giving interviews, talking about relevant topics, and showing many sketches throughout. It featured comedy, music, and games.

In a Sponsor-Only video, Burnie Burns said that RT-ES would be put on hiatus. Burns began by saying "occasionally we make some missteps", referring to RT-ES. He elaborated by saying Rooster Teeth would review audience feedback and apply it to the show in the future.

==== Commercial work ====
A screenshot from Apology, an advertisement which Electronic Arts commissioned from Rooster Teeth

In mid-2006, Electronic Arts commissioned Rooster Teeth to direct commercials for their EA Sports brand of games, including Madden NFL 07 and NCAA Football 07, for broadcast on television. Rooster Teeth released some of this work on their website. In late November 2006, controversy arose over a Madden NFL 07 commercial, when Indianapolis Colts tight end Dallas Clark complained about his depiction in the commercial. Hit and tackled multiple times in the advertisement by Philadelphia Eagles players, Clark stated, "I haven't seen the commercial, but I'm upset about it. It makes me look like a punk." In response, Rooster Teeth posted a director's cut, in which Clark plays and dominates every position.

They have also made a trailer for a free to play PC game called Loadout, developed by Austin-based Edge of Reality.

==== Film projects ====
In February 2014, Burns confirmed that the company was going to launch a crowdfunding campaign for a feature film, as a way to offer more support options while gaining publicity. In June 2014, an Indiegogo campaign for Lazer Team was launched. The fundraiser hit its $650,000 target within 11 hours and reached over $1.6 million two days later. The film was due for release in 2015. As of July 24, 2015, Lazer Team is the second-most-funded film project on Indiegogo, raising just under $2.5 million.

Production for Lazer Team began on October 9, 2014. On February 21, 2015, the first official teaser trailer was released, and on March 16, 2015, the full trailer was released. The film premiered at Fantastic Fest on September 24, 2015, where it received a generally positive reception. It was released in theaters on January 27, 2016.

On August 5, 2016, Burns and Free announced that Lazer Team 2 had been green-lit by Rooster Teeth in partnership with YouTube Red (now YouTube Premium), who financed the film, and that pre-production had begun. In December 2016, Matt Hullum confirmed Rooster Teeth would film Lazer Team 2 in Texas during the late spring of 2017 and planned to release it later that year. Daniel Fabelo co-directed the sequel with Hullum. Nichole Bloom and Victoria Pratt also joined the cast. Filming for the sequel concluded in April 2017.

At RTX Austin 2017, Rooster Teeth announced Blood Fest, a horror-comedy film directed by Owen Egerton, and starring Seychelle Gabriel, Robbie Kay and Jacob Batalon. Other cast members include Zachary Levi, Barbara Dunkelman, Nick Rutherford, and Tate Donovan.

=== Video game development ===
==== Rooster Teeth vs. Zombiens ====
Rooster Teeth vs. Zombiens is a game made by Team Chaos that features some of the main Rooster Teeth personnel in their fight against zombies in the Rooster Teeth office and parking lot. It was made for iOS, Android and Steam platforms. It has since been taken down from IOS and Android platforms.

==== RWBY: Grimm Eclipse ====
At RTX 2014, Rooster Teeth announced during the RWBY panel on July 4 that a RWBY video game was in development, under the working title RWBY: Grimm Eclipse, making this the first video game ever created by the company. An early demo of the game was available for consumers to play at the event. Rooster Teeth CEO Matt Hullum stated, "RWBY is a natural choice for us to focus on for our first in-house produced video game. Fans can expect that we will bring the same level of originality in action, comedy and design to the video game that has made the RWBY animated series such a hit."

RWBY: Grimm Eclipse was initially developed as a fangame by Jordan Scott over the course of five months. A demo version was released on April 1, 2014, to celebrate Rooster Teeth's 11th anniversary, but the demo is no longer available for download. Scott said at the time that it was not an ongoing project, and he had no plans for any future updates. He described it as a "survival-based action RPG" set in the world of RWBY.

On December 1, 2015, the game was released as an Early Access title on Steam after rapidly being approved through Steam's Greenlight feature.

==== Vicious Circle ====
Vicious Circle was first announced on episode 526 of the Rooster Teeth Podcast by Burnie Burns and Gus Sorola. It is an uncooperative multiplayer shooter and Rooster Teeth's first original IP game. It was released on August 13, 2019, on Steam.

== Subsidiary channels ==
=== Achievement Hunter ===
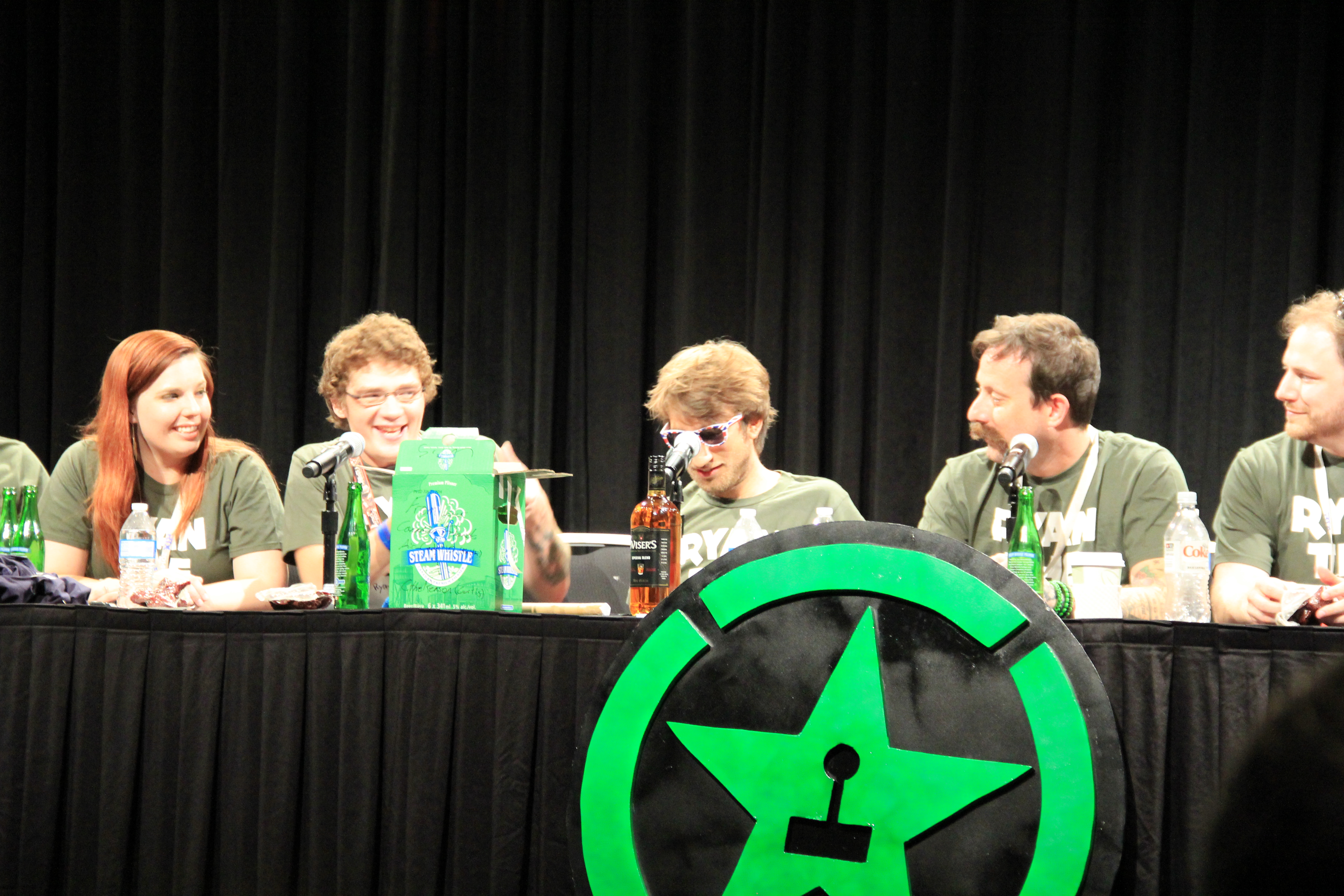
Cast members of Achievement Hunter at RTX 2014

Achievement Hunter was a video gaming channel and division of Rooster Teeth, originally created in 2008 by Geoff Ramsey and Jack Pattillo as a new creative outlet during production of season 6 of Red vs. Blue. The channel was largely based on the achievement mechanic found in seventh-generation video game consoles after being made popular with Microsoft's release of the Xbox 360 with the channels produced by a rotating cast Rooster Teeth employees. Achievement Hunter has since become its own division with a consistent cast and has become a core component of Rooster Teeth Productions. In addition to main live-action channel, Achievement Hunter hosts gameplay content on the company's LetsPlay channel. They also formerly managed GameFails and LetsPlay Community channels on YouTube, but those are no longer uploaded on and currently serve as an archive of past GameFails and LetsPlay Community content. On September 18, 2023, it was announced that Achievement Hunter would be converted into an archive channel and all members would be moving onto other projects.

=== LetsPlay ===
The LetsPlay channel has served a variety of uses since its launch, being most consistently used as the Let's Play channel for Achievement Hunter.

==== LetsPlay Network ====
The LetsPlay Network is a former multi-channel network (MCN) operated by Rooster Teeth. It was founded by Rooster Teeth co-founder Geoff Ramsey and was run by Luis Medina alongside Ramsey. Under this new venture, partnerships with several other YouTube channels, in addition to its own Achievement Hunter and Funhaus, would be established to would provide merchandise, promotion, and other benefits for its partners.

On March 28, 2016, a partnership with Kinda Funny was announced. Members of the group appear in Rooster Teeth content, and Kinda Funny merchandise became available on the Rooster Teeth Store. Kinda Funny Live! was presented by Let's Play and hosted by Burnie Burns. A partnership with The Creatures was announced on April 4, 2016. Upon their separate formations, channels Cow Chop and Game Attack were separately confirmed to be part of the "LetsPlay family". Game Attack, which was initially spun off from ScrewAttack before becoming its own independent entity, and Cow Chop both had their own sections on Rooster Teeth's website. On May 11, Achievement Hunter announced a partnership between the LetsPlay Network and video game publisher Ubisoft. Streams and gameplay videos done by any of the Let's Play family members featuring games published by Ubisoft will be released exclusively on the Ubisoft US YouTube channel. On May 31, 2017, it was announced that YouTubers JT Machinima (now JT Music), NoahJ456, LazarBeam, and Sugar Pine 7 had joined Let's Play, with JT Machinima being the first of which to have merchandise sold through the RT Store.

On July 12, 2017, it was announced that The Creatures would be disbanding, ending their relationship with Rooster Teeth. In April 2019, Cow Chop announced a "GOING OUT OF BUSINESS SALE", implying the channel would disband by the end of the year. On December 31, Cow Chop posted their final video. In May 2019, Sugar Pine 7 also announced their departure from the Rooster Teeth family. On May 1, 2019, Craig Skistimas of Game Attack announced they as well were now independent, had no further business relationship with Rooster Teeth and was no longer a part of the LetsPlay family. Since their departures, content from The Creatures and Game Attack are no longer hosted on Rooster Teeth's website and Cow Chop & Sugar Pine 7's content are now consolidated under the "Friends of RT" section.

While Rooster Teeth still maintains relationships with Kinda Funny and JT Music, along with new deals with other entities, the "LetsPlay Network" has not been referenced since the mentioned departures. A similar kind of partnership with UK based The Yogscast has occurred, a deal that includes their own section on Rooster Teeth's website and apps, but the LetsPlay branding and channel has reverted to its function as the gameplay channel for Achievement Hunter.

=== Inside Gaming ===
Inside Gaming was the gaming news division of Rooster Teeth. Originally founded as The Know, an entertainment news division that discusses current events in movies, TV shows, gaming, technology, and media. It was mainly hosted by Ashley Jenkins and Brian Gaar, with a selection of other Rooster Teeth staff from each division within the company. It was initially a single news show hosted on Rooster Teeth's main YouTube channel before moving over to its own channel, where it has since expanded into several different categories of entertainment and tech news as well as several different shows, with the latest being Glitch Please, a successor to their earlier podcast The Patch, that was greenlit for a full series after six pilot episodes. Previously The Know had hosted Leaderboard, where Meg Turney had discussed esports news, The Patch Game Club, where the hosts of The Patch would discuss a new video game they've played each week, and Screen Play, a film and TV podcast. In June 2016, Turney announced on her vlog she was leaving Rooster Teeth to focus more on cosplay.

In October 2017, Variety announced Eric Vespe would join The Know as senior writer responsible for original reporting, interviews and developing new entertainment shows. Vespe had previously worked at Ain't It Cool News for 20 years.

On February 14, 2019, Rooster Teeth revived Machinima's Inside Gaming brand, renaming The Know to Inside Gaming. The Know and Machinima's social team were combined with Inside Gaming. Lawrence Sonntag, Adam Kovic, Bruce Greene and Alanah Pearce from Funhaus hosted Inside Gaming, which includes gaming news, features and reviews. Greene and Sonntag left in 2019. Autumn Farrell, formerly of Sugar Pine 7, took over Sonntag's position. Farrell and Pearce departed the company in October 2020. On January 5, 2021, it was announced that Inside Gaming daily would end and all hosts would be joining Funhaus, however, the Inside Gaming weekend round-up would continue.

=== Game Kids ===
Game Kids was a kids channel launched in 2014, until 2016.

=== Funhaus ===
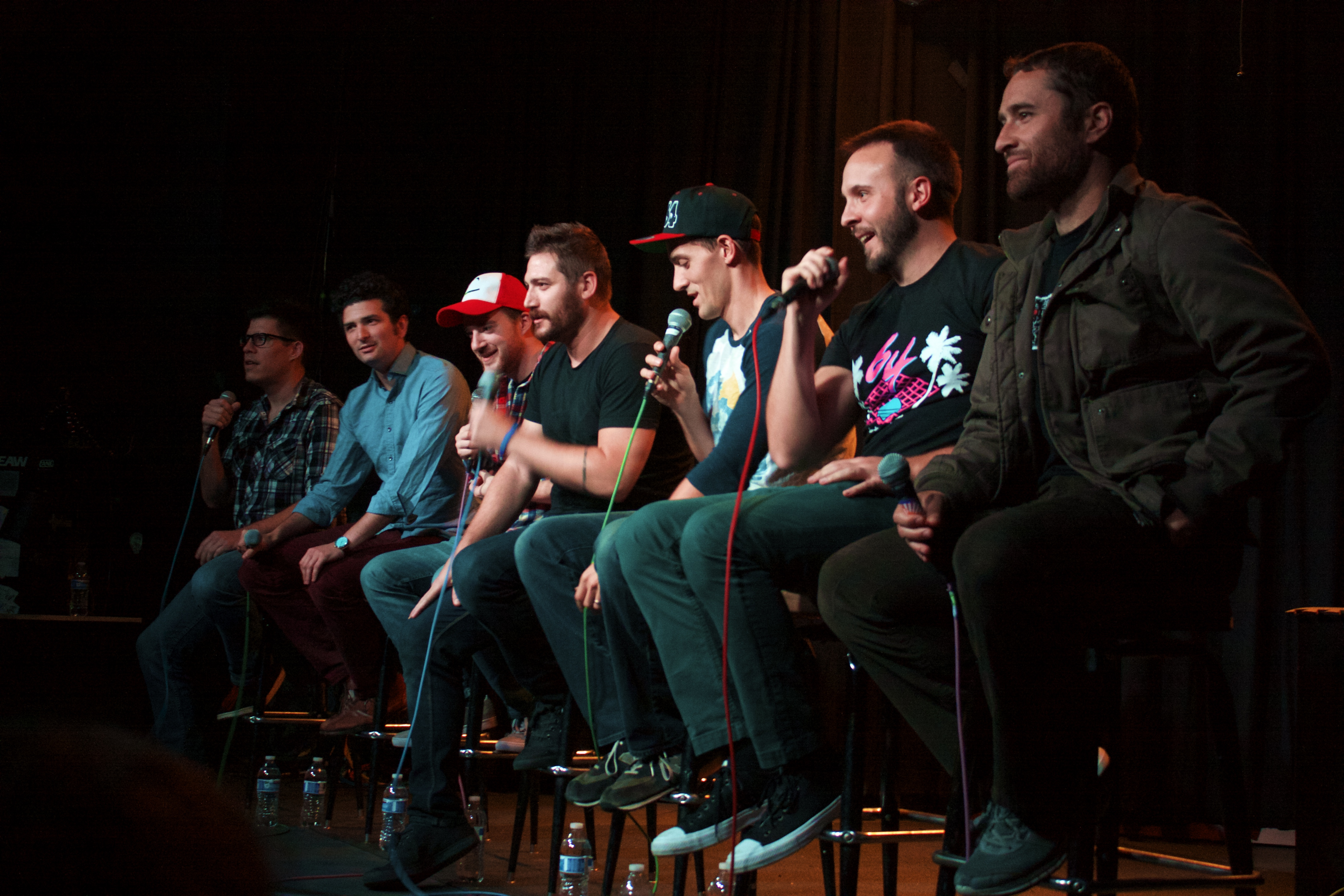
The cast of Funhaus at PAX Prime 2015

Funhaus (pronounced "funhouse") was a division of Rooster Teeth Productions, based in Los Angeles, California. The channel launched on February 16, 2015, by the former cast of Inside Gaming: Adam Kovic, James Willems, Bruce Greene, Lawrence Sonntag, Matt Peake, Sean "Spoole" Poole and Joel Rubin, later joined by former GameTrailers talent Elyse Willems in November 2015 and former IGN host Alanah Pearce in August 2018. Funhaus produced gameplay videos in a similar manner to Achievement Hunter. In addition to gameplay, Funhaus also produced segments for The Know up until November 2016. It produced many shows such as Open Haus (Q&A), Google Trends, podcasts called Dude Soup and "Film Haus", gameplay series such as Demo Disk and Wheelhaus, a now-defunct live stream called FunhausTV on YouTube, and the now-defunct Sex Swing: The Animated Series. Shows produced by Funhaus for Rooster Teeth TV include "No Idea", "Arizona Circle", and "Last Laugh".

In 2016, Poole and Rubin left Funhaus. Greene and Sonntag left in 2019. Kovic departed the company after breaching its code of conduct in October 2020. Pearce announced her departure in late October 2020.

=== Death Battle ===
Death Battle debuted in 2010 as a web series published by the website ScrewAttack. Death Battle became ScrewAttack's most popular show and the website began to shift its focus towards the show, and in 2019 ScrewAttack rebranded to focus exclusively on it. The show was acquired by Rooster Teeth, and all of ScrewAttack's existing content was moved to the Rooster Teeth website. In 2020, Amazon Prime Video sponsored a promotional episode of Death Battle to advertise the second season of The Boys.

Death Battle was published by Rooster Teeth from 2019 until 2024, at which point Rooster Teeth was shut down by its parent company, Warner Bros. Discovery. Following the disestablishment of Rooster Teeth, Death Battle became an independent series.

== Events ==
Community-run events have occurred regularly since 2005. These included RvBTO in Toronto (the first event, now retired and replaced with Toronto:Unconventional), RvBCanWest in Vancouver, RT Philly in Philadelphia, RooTeeth in Melbourne, and SideQuest in Austin. In February 2011, Sorola announced the date for the first RTX, the company's first official fan event. Burns credited RTX "starting" with the early fan events in Canada.

=== RTX ===
In May 2011, Rooster Teeth held their first official community event in Austin, Texas. Initially planned as a small gathering for 200 people, demand was so high that over 500 tickets were accidentally sold within minutes of being made available online. Since RTX 2012, each event has been held in the Austin Convention Center, with the attendance growing from 5,000 in 2012 to 45,000 in 2015. In February 2017, RTX London was announced, taking place October 14–15 of that year. Amid the COVID-19 pandemic, RTX 2020, dubbed "RTX at Home", was held virtually from September 15 to 25.

=== Let's Play Live ===
Let's Play Live is an on-stage event produced by Rooster Teeth in which Achievement Hunter and members of the Let's Play family play video games and perform comedy sketches in front of a live audience. Their first event was held on February 20, 2015, at the Moody Theater in Austin, Texas. Beginning in 2016, LPL toured multiple cities across North America. LPL returned to Austin the night before RTX 2018 began.

== Podcasts ==
=== Rooster Teeth Podcast ===
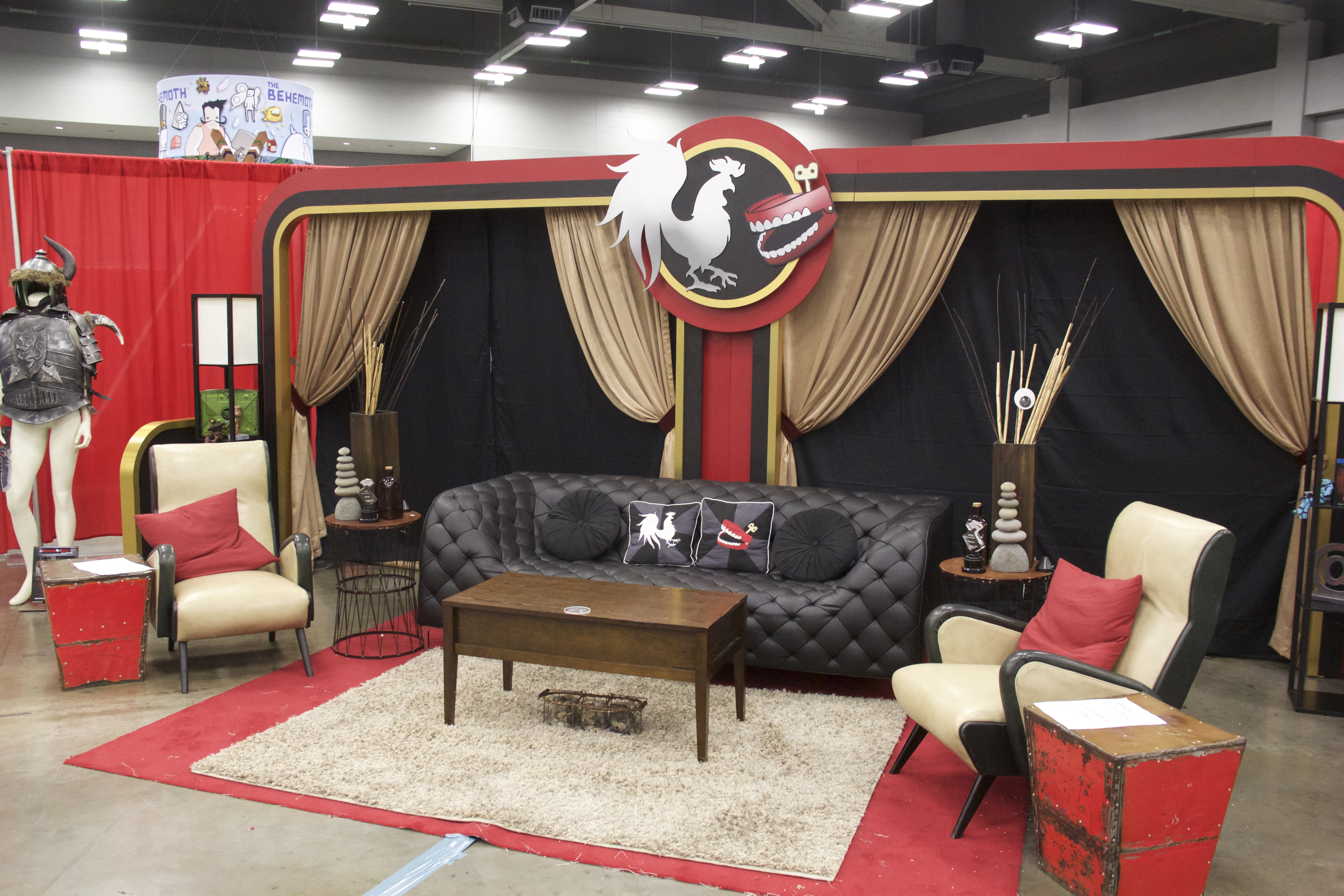
The set of the Rooster Teeth Podcast as of 2015

On December 9, 2008, Rooster Teeth launched the Drunk Tank podcast. It was renamed the Rooster Teeth Podcast in 2011, due to the previous name not being attractive to advertisers. The podcast is released weekly, and has won several honors, including being the most downloaded podcast on iTunes and winning the Best Gaming Podcast award at the Podcast Awards in 2013 and 2014. As of May 2023, the podcast has over 750 episodes the same year the podcast moved to a multi segment based show featuring new hosts

=== The Roost ===
In June 2017 Rooster Teeth launched its own podcast network, called The Roost, representing creators such as h3h3Productions, Game Grumps, Shane Dawson, Getting Doug With High by Doug Benson, Tiny Meat Gang by Cody Ko and Noel Miller, and The Valleyfolk by Joseph Bereta, Elliott Morgan, and Steve Zaragoza among others. In July 2018, The Roost added The Last Podcast on the Left, hosted by Ben Kissel, Marcus Parks, and Henry Zebrowski. On September 5, 2018, it was revealed that The Roost would also support both current and upcoming podcasts from The Beam, another podcast network, as part of a partnership between Rooster Teeth and Hello Sunshine.

A.J Feliciano became the head of the network in August 2020. In October 2020 The Roost began representing prop collecting podcast The Stuff Dreams Are Made Of. Rooster Teeth and AEW partnered to create the podcast Wrestling With The Week in January 2021. Anthony Padilla, along with Grace Helbig and Mamrie Hart, launched podcasts with The Roost in early 2021. As of September 2021, The Roost network has over 100 shows and receives 300 million impressions per month. Rooster Teeth said the network increased its viewership by 50% and quadrupled revenue in 2021.

In April 2024, The Roost was purchased by Night, talent management company for several big YouTubers and Twitch streamers including MrBeast. In an interview with Variety, A.J. Feliciano stated most of The Roost staff would be kept on. In the same article Variety claimed The Roost's network of shows has over 350 million views and 20 million monthly downloads as of April 2024. However they provide no sources for these numbers.

== Community and website ==
"I think the biggest place we've had to adapt is, we've always believed we have to have our own corner on the web, that we don't try to build our own company on Facebook or on MySpace back in the day, or even on Twitter or Snapchat. We try to have RoosterTeeth.com be our destination." ― Burnie Burns, July 8, 2016

=== Overview ===
On October 4, 2004, after closing their phpBB forums, Rooster Teeth publicly launched an online community and social networking website as a way to stay in touch with fans while maintaining their own platform for distribution. This site included features such as community statistics, journals, an image gallery and a "mod point system" or "emodomy" that was meant to help members moderate the site with options to like or dislike posts. Currently, it receives 5 million unique monthly visitors and is home to over 2 million registered users of which 135,000 pay $5 per month as FIRST members.

=== Rooster Teeth First ===
To host their own videos, Rooster Teeth paid a co-location facility $13,000. The cost from server fees prompted Rooster Teeth to implement a site wide program called "Sponsorships" in 2003 (later rebranded as Rooster Teeth First members), which gave paying members access to content before being offered to the public, in addition to extra site features, exclusive videos and merchandise. Sponsorships have been credited with "keeping the lights on" in the company's early years and a "major reason" for Rooster Teeth's growth and the first way that they monetized content.

On July 1, 2016, the ad-free "Sponsorship" program was rebranded as "FIRST" and offered a new option to upgrade to an even higher-level tier called Double Gold that included such perks as: a 10% discount on all Rooster Teeth items, first access to live event VIP passes and a box of merchandise carrying a value more than $60.

=== Community ===
Rooster Teeth's founders often emphasize the importance of the community and how it has helped them to remain relevant in web culture. In 2010, Burnie Burns stated he, "could not imagine RedVsBlue or Rooster Teeth without the community site". In 2014 Gus Sorola said, "From the beginning we have always maintained and promoted our own community site, since before YouTube even existed". Building community is key to having an engaged, active audience who really enjoy your content." Burns elaborated on this in September 2014, attributing how they've managed to build a global audience to constantly engaging in a two-way conversation with the company's "hyper engaged core". In 2016, Burns reiterated their growth again to listening and taking the community's feedback to heart. Burns repeated in 2016 that he considers the secret to the company's successes is their community and their conversation with the community. "Our model revolves around being the home for a core community, and growing it year-after-year ... the loyalty of a community to spread the gospel of your brand is absolutely critical" Fullscreen CEO George Strompolos, after acquiring Rooster Teeth, cited the "insanely powerful community" as a reason they felt the company was a perfect match to buy and later attributed Lazer Team's success to the power of the community. In 2015, during the production of Rooster Teeth's first feature, co-founder and Director Matt Hullum stated, "We would not have been able to make Lazer Team without the community and really I don't think we would've wanted to." In 2017, Burns re-emphasized that "community is the cornerstone of Rooster Teeth" and one of their core values they impress upon new employees.

=== Distinguished community members ===
Community members have distinguished themselves on and beyond the website. Notable people to come from the community include Gavin Free, Barbara Dunkelman, and Kent Nichols. In October 2008, community member "Jeffson" became the first person to post that Barack Obama's presidential campaign had taken out billboards within the Xbox 360 version of Burnout Paradise. After being posted to his journal, the story was picked up by major news outlets, including GamePolitics, MTV and Wired. In 2010, Achievement Hunter community members "AxialMatt" and "Hightower" garnered attention with their Japan World Cup 3 video. For Red vs. Blue: Revelation, Rooster Teeth used 10 community members to help unlock Halo 3 armor suits for machinima production purposes. In February 2011, Burns tweeted that community member "madmanmoe" discovered the Rooster Teeth website was not blocked by the Libyan government and was blogging events on the website from Tripoli during the First Libyan Civil War. The longest-running external resource site, RoosterTooths, has existed since 2005 and contains transcripts, biographies, and a history of the Red vs. Blue title screen.

Community members have been utilized for RT productions at every single RTX. In 2011, some 400 community members were used as zombie extras for a Horde Mode episode of Immersion. In 2012, 1,800 attendees were used as extras for a scene in the RT production, Day 5, which involved shutting down the main road in downtown Austin. In 2013, hundreds of fans were used as extras for a water-bomb attack in an episode of The Slow Mo Guys. In 2014, casting calls and auditions for minor speaking roles in Lazer Team were held for RTX attendees. In 2015, attendees were invited to participate in an interactive, "narrative-driven experience" called Murder at The RTX which involved hunting clues at prepared "crime scenes". On June 20, 2016, Rooster Teeth confirmed they would be filming audience members at an RTX panel for use in their latest production, Crunch Time.

Many employees have come from the community. In 2014, Burns estimated "at least a third" of the company of 85 started in the fan community, adding it "keeps us grounded" and "makes a whole lot of sense from a business standpoint ... I don't have to explain to them what this company is trying to do." Ben McSweeney, illustrator of Rooster Teeth's logo, was hired by Burns after being found on the site's community forums in April 2003. Others include creative director Barbara Dunkelman, composers Nico Audy-Rowland and Jeff Williams of Trocadero, cartoonist Luke McKay, Achievement Hunters Caleb Denecour and Ray Narvaez Jr., Rooster Teeth Animated Adventures creator Jordan Cwierz, and RWBY writer and director Kerry Shawcross. In August 2014, former intern and current content producer Blaine Gibson garnered media attention when he posted photos proposing to Disney Princesses at Walt Disney World. In July 2014 it was announced at RTX that fan Jordan Scott would be making the RWBY video game after posting footage of a demo he had made to his YouTube page. It was also announced during the RTX 2014 Achievement Hunter panel that Community Hunters Matthew "AxialMatt" Bragg and Jeremy "Jerem6401" Dooley would be joining AH as its newest employees.

== Controversies ==
=== Sexual harassment accusations ===
In February 2019, Rooster Teeth announced that they had ended all associations with voice actor Vic Mignogna and removed him from the RWBY cast. Although there were several allegations of inappropriate behavior and sexual harassment, no charges were filed against him and Mignogna denied allegations of criminal misconduct. Mignogna pursued defamation lawsuits after the accusations were made against him, and although he lost appeals and was ordered to pay legal fees, the civil rulings only determined whether the statements were defamatory.

In October 2020, Achievement Hunter's Ryan Haywood and Funhaus co-founder Adam Kovic were both involved in scandals involving their leaked nudes; Kovic parted ways with the company. Days later, multiple allegations of grooming underage fans came out against Haywood, and he was subsequently fired.

=== Toxic work culture accusations ===
In June 2019, dozens of anonymous reviews from Glassdoor gained exposure, highlighting a negative crunch culture of long and unpaid hours, poor management, and over-reliance on temporary employees at Rooster Teeth Animation. Gray Haddock, Rooster Teeth's Head of Animation, stepped down two days after the allegations.

In October 2022, Kdin Jenzen, a former Achievement Hunter employee, posted online about her experiences working at the company. She accused the company of still having a "crunch" culture, not paying her fairly, and homophobic and transphobic abuse by upper management, to the extent that her nickname at the company was a slur. Hours later, Achievement Hunter cast members, including Rooster Teeth co-founder Geoff Ramsey, responded to Jenzen's message apologizing for their prior behavior at the company, as well as announcing a reduced release schedule for the future. The following day, Rooster Teeth released a statement addressing the situation, claiming that they were taking steps to improve their work culture and reviewing pay parity at the company. Following Jenzen's message, numerous other former employees spoke up about their experiences working at Rooster Teeth, adding more accounts of unpaid work and discriminatory abuse while at the company. Rooster Teeth then released a second statement apologizing for harmful behaviors, listing changes made since 2020 including the introduction of pay bands and the replacement of the entire Human Resources department.

=== Michael Quinn arrest ===
On November 20, 2019, Michael Quinn, Rooster Teeth's Vice President of Product Research and Engineering, was arrested for assaulting his wife. Quinn was fired three days later.

== Bibliography ==
- "All New Red vs. Blue Series". Xbox.com. Microsoft Corporation. Archived from the original on August 11, 2007.
- Burns, Burnie (writer, director); et al. (2003). Red vs. Blue Season One (DVD). Buda, Texas: Rooster Teeth Productions.
- Burns, Burnie (writer, director); et al. (2006). The Strangerhood Season One (DVD). Buda, Texas: Rooster Teeth Productions.
- Chappell, Mike. "Commercial irks Clark". IndyStar.com. Archived from the original on October 16, 2007.
- "FearFans.com". Sierra Entertainment. Archived from the original on June 21, 2006.
- Gersh, Carl (November 17, 2005). "Press Release: To Promote F.E.A.R., Vivendi Universal Games Selects BeSeen Communications and Rooster Teeth Productions for Online Viral Campaign – Widespread P.A.N.I.C.S. Ensues". BeSeen Communications. Archived from the original on April 27, 2006.
- Gross, Joe (July 6, 2004). "'Red Vs. Blue' = Green". Austin American-Statesman. Cox Texas Newspapers, L.P. Archived from the original on October 16, 2007.
- "Halo 3 Details Explosion". GameWorld Network News. GameWorld, Inc. October 29, 2006. Archived from the original on November 8, 2006.
- "The History of Red vs. Blue". Red vs. Blue. Rooster Teeth Productions.
- Hullum, Matt (July 28, 2006). "Ahh ... Memories". Rooster Teeth Productions.
- Hullum, Matt (July 17, 2006). "Working Vacation". Rooster Teeth Productions.
- Konow, David (September 24, 2005). "The Cult of Red vs. Blue". TwitchGuru. Tom's Guide Publishing. Archived from the original on December 31, 2006.
- Kosak, Dave (November 16, 2004). "GameSpy Examines the Teeth of the Rooster". GameSpy. IGN Entertainment, Inc.
- Leggat, Graham. "Cock Byte: Masters of Machinima". San Francisco International Film Festival. San Francisco Film Society. Archived from the original on June 15, 2006.
- "Mac Gamer Switch Parody". Rooster Teeth Productions.
- "Machinima Awards 2003 Results". Machinima.com. Machinima, Inc. Archived from the original on June 13, 2007.
- "Machinima Theater". Austin Game Conference. Archived from the original on July 19, 2006.
- "Mackie Winners Announced!". 2005 Machinima Film Festival. Archived from the original on February 15, 2007.
- Oliver, Caitlin (January 2005). "Red vs. Blue Q&A". @anime! Ionfuse. Animetro Studios. Archived from the original on June 13, 2006.
- "Red Vs. Blue: The Cash Is Always Greener". Forbes. December 10, 2006.
- "Red vs. Blue: The Interview Strikes Back". Bungie. Microsoft Corporation. Archived from the original on December 23, 2005.
- Robinson, Jon (November 30, 2006). "Dallas Clark is Totally Wicked". IGN. IGN Entertainment, Inc.
- Saldaña, Jason (April 27, 2006). "Strangerhood 17 wants to be your friend". The Strangerhood. Rooster Teeth Productions.
- Sorola, Gustavo. "Episode 100 – Why Were We Here?". Red vs. Blue. Rooster Teeth Productions.
- Thompson, Clive (August 7, 2005). "The Xbox Auteurs". The New York Times.
- Waters, Darren (August 7, 2003). "Animators turn to video games". BBC News Online. BBC.
- Williams, G. Christopher (March 2, 2005). "The Strangerhood". PopMatters. PopMatters Media, Inc.
