= Burnie Burns =

American actor (born 1973)

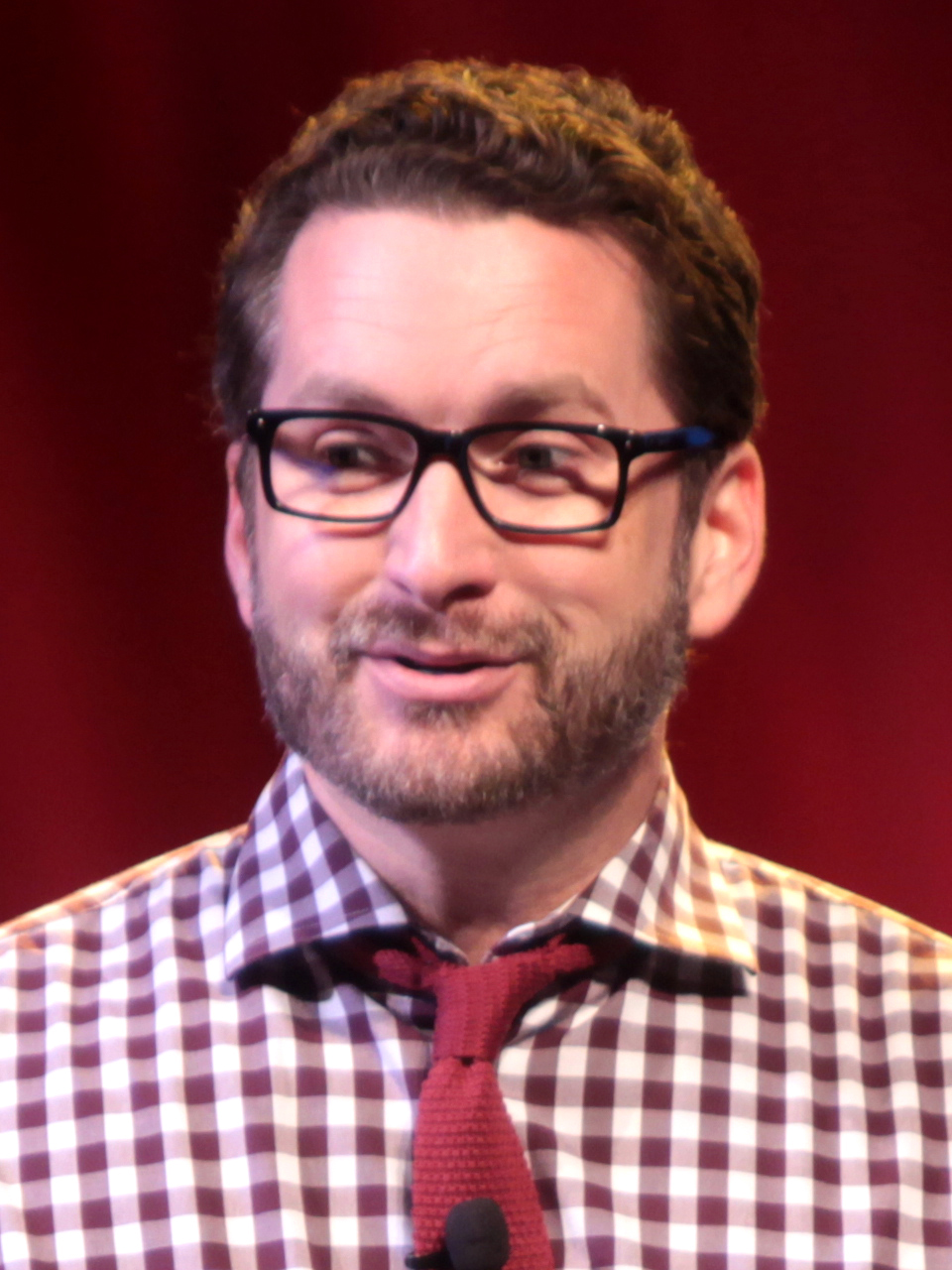
- Burns at VidCon in 2014
- Born: Michael Justin Burns; January 18, 1973 (age 53); Rochester, New York, U.S.
- Education: University of Texas, Austin (BA)
- Occupations: Actor; writer media proprietor
- Years active: 1997–present
- Title: Co-founder and Executive Producer at Rooster Teeth (2003–2024)
- Spouses: Jordan Burns (m. 2000; div. 2011); Ashley Jenkins (m. 2019)
- Children: 4
- Website: www.burnie.com

Michael Justin "Burnie" Burns (born January 18, 1973) is an American actor, writer, director and media proprietor from Austin, Texas. He was a co-founder, former chief executive officer, and former chief creative officer of Rooster Teeth. He is noted for his contributions in machinima, a form of filmmaking that uses video game technology in its production, and also works with animation and live action. Burns is also known for his work in the hosting and podcasting field.

In April 2003, Burns, along with several friends and co-workers, created the machinima series Red vs. Blue: The Blood Gulch Chronicles. Filmed using the video game Halo, Red vs. Blue was acclaimed for its humor and originality, making Burns an Internet celebrity. His success allowed him to co-found the production company Rooster Teeth. After the immediate popularity of Red vs. Blue, Burns attracted the attention of video game company Electronic Arts, who asked him to create a promotional series using their upcoming game, The Sims 2. The result was The Strangerhood. Burns also premiered P.A.N.I.C.S., a mini-series that utilizes the F.E.A.R. game engine. In 2016, Burns starred in the science fiction comedy film Lazer Team and its sequel the following year, both of which he co-wrote.

As one of the innovators in the field of machinima, he has made guest appearances at the Penny Arcade Expo, San Diego Comic-Con, Sundance and The Sydney Film Festival. For his work on Immersion (2010), a live action series that tests video game tropes in the real world, and The Gauntlet (2013), Rooster Teeth's reality game show, he has been nominated for two IAWTV awards in the "Best Host of a Web Series (Pre-Recorded)" category. He was named one of the "Top 25 Digital Stars" by The Hollywood Reporter in 2015. Alongside longtime-business partner Matt Hullum, he was named one of Variety's top Digital Entertainment Execs to Watch in 2018.

== Early life ==
Burns being interviewed by TSTV in 2012 about his time at University of Texas and his career since

Burns was born in the Rochester, New York, area and grew up in Houston, Texas. His father was a physics professor who worked on the Desertron Super Collider. He is of one quarter French-Canadian descent. The nickname "Burnie" was given to him by an Alief Elsik High School senior to separate him from the many Michaels in his class. Burns's determination to pursue a medical career led him to become a member of HOSA. Half of his senior year consisted of clinical rotations at Southwest Memorial Hospital.

After high school, he was accepted at the University of Notre Dame but, unable to afford the tuition, he chose to attend The University of Texas at Austin, where he received a Bachelor of Arts in Computer Science. While there, Burns got his start in video production by volunteering at K29HW-D, Texas Student Television. During his time with TSTV, he founded Sneak Peek, the longest-running student television program in the world, in which he reviewed films and conducted interviews with guests such as Adam Sandler.

Burns went on to become the president of the tech support company teleNetwork Partners, and eventually broke out to form his independent company Rooster Teeth.

== Career ==
=== First film and viral video: 1997–2002 ===
In his final year of university, Burns was intent on making a movie. Joel Heyman and Matt Hullum, who were roommates at the time, agreed to help, with the former agreeing to star and the latter helping write, produce and direct. They shot The Schedule (1997) over a three-month period on 16mm film for $9,000. It took 10 months to edit on a non-linear editor Burns himself built. That same system was used in his early videos, including their first viral hit.

Burns became frustrated with the difficult distribution process and the film only screened in a few festivals. They turned down an offer of about $25,000 to buy because they "wanted to hold onto the story." A few VHS copies of The Schedule exist in Burns's possession. Soon after, the trio parted ways. Heyman and Hullum went to Los Angeles, while Burns accepted a position at a local tech support company.

There, he met his co-workers and future Red vs. Blue collaborators Geoff Ramsey and Gus Sorola. In June 2002, Burns teamed up with his colleagues to create their first viral video, a Mac Gamer Switch parody.

That moment is probably the single most important moment in the history of this company. Even more so than when we put the first video of Red vs. Blue online. That's when we developed a lot of the early strategies... that's why to this day we still have a website, we still have our own presence on there, which we think is an important part of what we do."

Burns attributes "two vectors that came together, the movie guys and the tech guys," as being a catalyst for their success.

=== Red vs. Blue: 2003–2024 ===
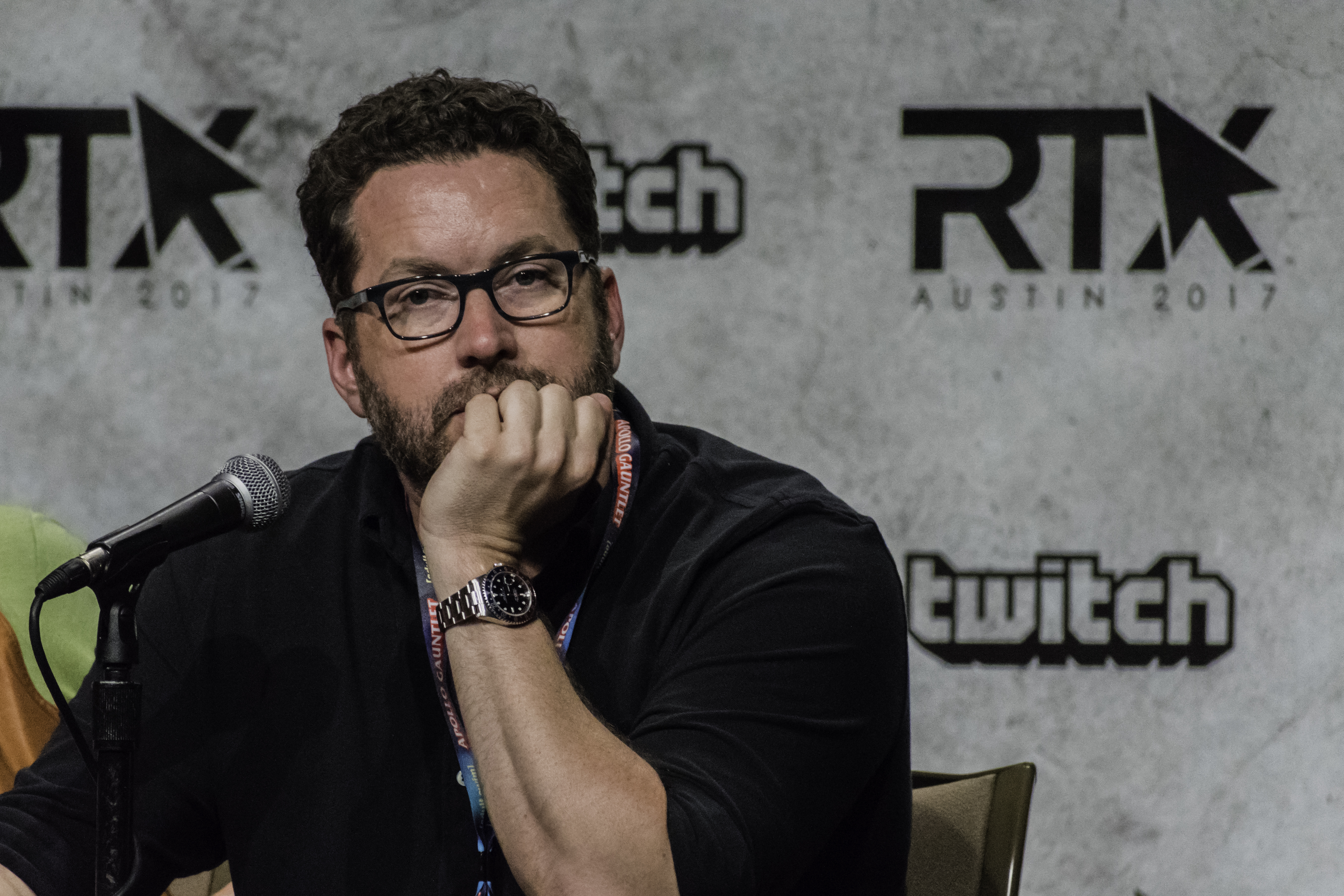
Burnie Burns at RTX 2017 convention in Austin, Texas during the "Red vs Blue" panel discussion

Burns joined Geoff Ramsey and Gus Sorola in one of their many Internet ventures, drunkgamers.com creating voiceover-enhanced gameplay videos for the website. The trio were giant enthusiasts of the 2001 first-person shooter video game Halo: Combat Evolved, leading them to discuss whether an automobile in the game known as a Warthog looks like a puma. Burns has said that this discussion was "the spark for the whole series". Seeing potential for a full story, Burns created a trailer for Red vs. Blue, which was released September 5, 2002 on the drunkgamers website, but it was largely ignored, and, for unrelated reasons, drunkgamers soon closed. Four months later, Computer Gaming World contacted Ramsey for permission to include a different drunkgamers video in a CD to be distributed with the magazine. Ramsey granted permission, but he and Burns felt that they needed a website to take advantage of the exposure from Computer Gaming World. They therefore resurrected Red vs. Blue and re-released the trailer to coincide with the Computer Gaming World issue. Burns founded the production company Rooster Teeth to produce the show with Sorola, Ramsey, Matt Hullum and Joel Heyman. The first episode was released on April 1, 2003. The series is primarily produced using the machinima technique of synchronizing video footage from a game to pre-recorded dialogue and other audio.

Burns initially envisioned Red vs. Blue to be short, but the series grew beyond his expectations. Burns and Ramsey had preconceived a list of jokes for which they allocated six to eight episodes. By episode 8, however, they realized that the series had fleshed out more than expected; they had covered only about one third of their original list. At the same time, the show received the attention of major websites such as Slashdot, Penny Arcade, and Fark, leading to thousands of views. Later in season 1, Burns estimated a series of 22 episodes; however, driven by the series' popularity, he realized that there was more potential story than could be covered in that length, and was able to conceive an extension of the season 1 plot. Burns and the whole production team eventually quit their jobs and began to work full-time on the series; to generate revenue they created an online store to sell T-shirts.

After the first season of Red vs. Blue, Burns became a celebrity in the machinima community. As the director, writer, and lead actor of the series, he was the driving force behind the series. His series earned three awards at the 2003 Machinima Film Festival – Best Picture, Best Writing, and Best Independent Machinima Film – and was nominated for three others.

The series completed its original five season 100-episode run on June 28, 2007, collectively known as the Blood Gulch Chronicles. Subsequent seasons were re-tooled with The Recollection Trilogy for seasons 6–8 (Reconstruction, Recreation, and Revelation), and The Freelancer Saga for seasons 9 and 10. Since season eleven, which premiered on June 14, 2013, Burns handed directorial and head writing duties to Miles Luna to shift his focus onto other projects. He still provided voice work for characters such as Church, Lopez and Vic until 2021 when Lopez was recast with Eddy Rivas taking over the role. In 2023, it was announced Burns would return to write the show's final season with longtime business partner Matt Hullum also returning as director, planned to air in 2024.

=== The Strangerhood and PANICS: 2004–2006 ===
In 2004, 13 months after the first season of Red vs. Blue had finished airing, Burns and Matt Hullum created the comedy web series The Strangerhood. The series uses the same machinima technique used to film Red vs. Blue.

The idea for the series came from the E3 gaming convention where Burns and his Rooster Teeth partners were introduced to the life simulation game The Sims 2 and realized that the game would be suitable for a series that parodied reality television. The game's publisher Electronic Arts allowed them to continue with the project. The series centers on eight strangers who awake one day unaware of where they are or how they arrived there. Its first season of 17 episodes completed on April 27, 2006. In 2005, the group collaborated with Paul Marino on Strangerhood Studios, a spin-off commissioned by the Independent Film Channel. This spin-off was the first machinima series to be commissioned for broadcast and won an award for Best Editing at the 2005 Machinima Film Festival.

The following year Burns and Rooster Teeth created the comic science fiction machinima mini-series P.A.N.I.C.S. based on and filmed using the video game F.E.A.R. developed by Monolith Productions, who asked them to produce the series for the Director's Edition of the game. The series consists of five episodes.

The story centers on a newcomer to Bravo Team, a special military group formed to battle supernatural enemies. As the series begins, Bravo Team has been sent into a military facility at night to investigate the reports of paranormal activity from within. This is a parody of the main scenario used in F.E.A.R.

=== Return to live-action, Captain Dynamic and RT Shorts: 2009 ===
Burns first returned to live-action with Captain Dynamic a mini-series to promote the online game City of Heroes. It was based around a team of writers hired to use the new in-game content creation tools to promote the title character, Captain Dynamic, the 'worst superhero in the world'. Directed by Matt Hullum and written by Burns, the series starred Ed Robertson of the Barenaked Ladies, who is a long time friend.

The series was well received by fans, which led him and Rooster Teeth to begin producing a new live-action series, titled Rooster Teeth Shorts (also referred to as RT Shorts), a sketch comedy which parodies life at their offices. The series features the staff of Rooster Teeth, including Burns, who all play caricatures of themselves, as well as occasional appearances from voice actors from some of their machinima series. The first season ran for twenty episodes and five seasons have since followed, as well as six-second mini episodes released exclusively through the video sharing service Vine.

=== Hosting and producing work: 2008–2015 ===
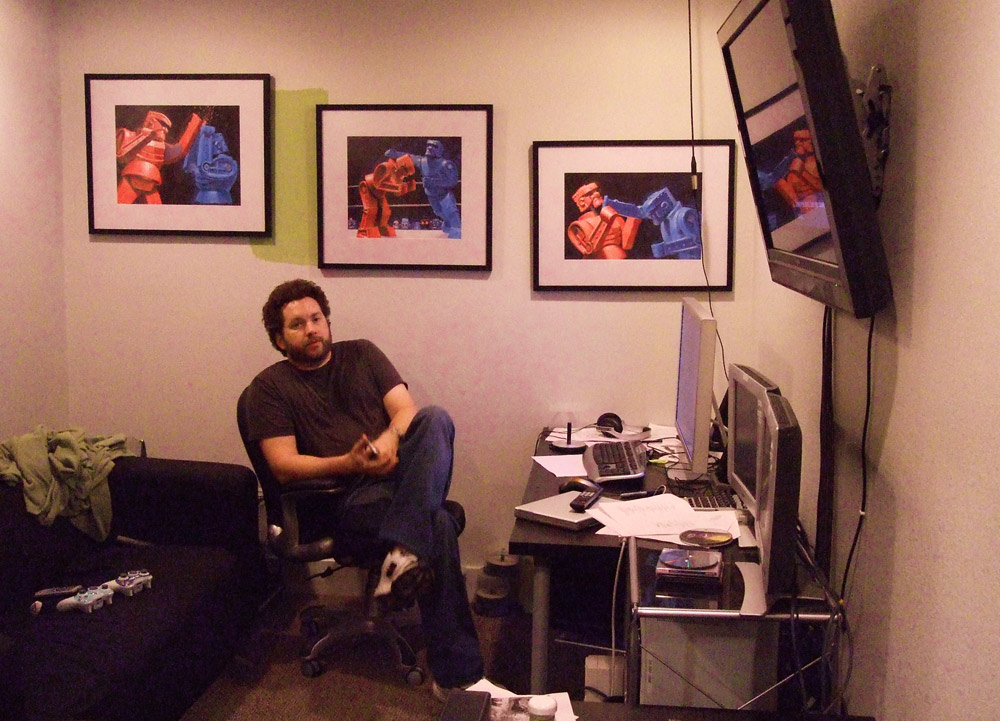
Burns in the Rooster Teeth office in Austin, Texas in 2008

On December 29, 2008, Burns co-hosted the inaugural episode of the Drunk Tank audio podcast, alongside his Rooster Teeth co-workers Geoff Ramsey and Gus Sorola. The podcast consists largely of comedic commentary on the popular culture of the week, including video games, recent news, website features, sports and upcoming projects and is available for download through iTunes, Zune Marketplace and their website. It has since become one of the more popular features of the site, at one point becoming the #1 most downloaded podcast on iTunes, as well as a featured podcast in the iTunes Store. New episodes have been released regularly every Wednesday since April 10, 2009, with occasional special episodes or multiple releases in one week.

In September 2011, the podcast was renamed The Rooster Teeth Podcast. The show has since become available in video form and Burns continues to make regular appearances. On January 7, the podcast won "Best Gaming Podcast" at the 8th Annual Podcast Awards. The Rooster Teeth Podcast has recently adapted a new style of doing podcasts in which they live stream to "sponsors" on their website, in video, the night before the release of the audio podcast on iTunes and their site. The sponsor live stream is then later available 1 day on the Rooster website and 2 days later on YouTube.

Burns began co-hosting Immersion alongside Griffon Ramsey in 2010. The show tests the concepts of video games in real life, such as whether the heckling that sometimes occurs in multiplayer video games would negatively affect the performance of real soldiers. Burns joked in The Rooster Teeth Podcast that the series started as an "elaborate way for [them] to do fun stuff and get paid for it". Geoff Ramsey and Gus Sorola were the test subjects throughout the first season. Gavin Free and Michael Jones (of Achievement Hunter) served as the test subjects for the second season.

On Halloween 2012, a partnership between Rooster Teeth and Blip was announced, with the premiere of their new 10-episode, reality game competition series sponsored by GEICO. The Gauntlet follows gamers from around the United States competing in contests of skills, concentration, agility and stamina, inspired by reality competitions Wipeout and The Voice. The first season was hosted by Ali Baker and Burns. Season two was hosted by Burns and Joel Heyman and began on September 7, 2013.

The pilot episode of Million Dollars, But... premiered on May 21, 2015, with the series continuing on July 9, 2015. The ongoing series is frequently co-hosted by Burns and Gavin Free, with another special guest taking part. Each person has to come up with a typically difficult scenario, for example one where the person has to date Adolf Hitler for a year — which the cast comically re-enact — for which they will be given a million dollars.

His producing work includes executive producing the 2012 documentary film Minecraft: The Story of Mojang, about the Swedish video game developer Mojang, the creators of the popular video game Minecraft. In 2013, he began executive producing the anime-influenced web series RWBY, created by Rooster Teeth employee Monty Oum. A second season premiered in 2014. Oum died on February 1, 2015. A third season of the show premiered on October 24, 2015. In 2014, Burns served as executive producer on the show X-Ray and Vav, a cartoon web series starring two Achievement Hunter employees (a video gaming division of Rooster Teeth) Gavin Free and Ray Narvaez Jr. In 2016, Burns and Gavin Free hosted the documentary World's Greatest Head Massage: An ASMR Journey.

=== Lazer Team and other film projects: 2015–2019 ===
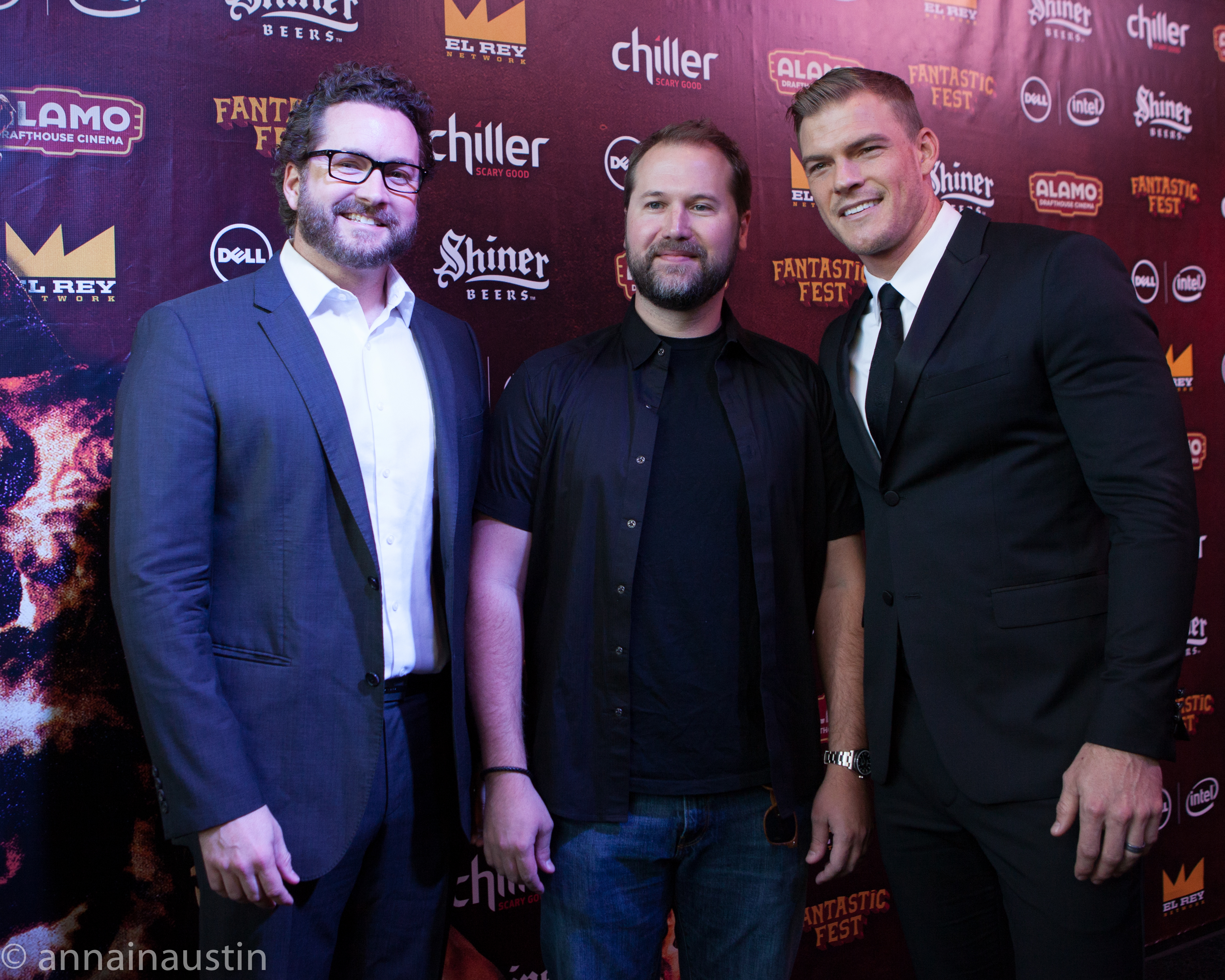
Burns with director Matt Hullum and co-star Alan Ritchson at the premiere of Lazer Team

In June 2014, Rooster Teeth launched a crowdfunding campaign for the film Lazer Team on Indiegogo. The fundraiser reached its $650,000 goal in under 10 hours and broke Indiegogo's record for the fastest film campaign to reach $700,000. Within three days, Lazer Team broke $1 million. As of 2015, Lazer Team held the record for the highest funded film campaign on Indiegogo with over $2.4 million collected.

Burns explained during the campaign that as it makes more money, the film's budget scales up. "The initial budget for talent was based on making the movie on the bare minimum with us throwing in the remainder of the expected budget. For instance, that meant using talent almost exclusively from in-house. As the budget grows, so do our opportunities to approach all kinds of talent. The same applies to Visual FX, quality of props and costuming, lighting, crew, etc." Burns co-wrote, co-produces, and co-stars in the film as Hagan. It was released in January 2016, making it among the first titles that Rooster Teeth's parent company, Fullscreen, will be distributing in its newly launched feature film division.

Burns appeared in the 2015 short film, Hit, as Officer Harris and the sports comedy-drama The Outfield. Burns appeared in the YouTube Red series 12 Deadly Days from Blumhouse Television.

=== Post-Rooster Teeth and Morning Somewhere: 2019–present ===
In September 2019, Burns' involvement within Rooster Teeth became one of executive producer, withdrawing from on camera appearances focusing on larger projects behind the scenes.

In June 2020, Burns officially left Rooster Teeth, announcing on his blog a focus on his family alongside a move abroad.

On December 26, 2023, after a period of withdrawal from the public eye, Burns launched the daily podcast Morning Somewhere, co-hosted with wife Ashley Burns in their home in Scotland.

On February 5, 2025, Burns announced he had acquired the Rooster Teeth brand and its remaining intellectual properties through his company Box Canyon Productions. On August 7, 2025, the Rooster Teeth site was relaunched, as announced on his Morning Somewhere podcast.

== Other work ==
Burns has participated in two episodes of the improvisational comedy game show @midnight. In 2015, Burns took part in twenty-eighth season of The Amazing Race with his then-fiancée, Ashley Jenkins, coming in fourth place. In 2017, Burns made a brief cameo in It's Always Sunny in Philadelphia as a bar patron with no lines. In September 2017, alongside Jenkins, he co-hosted the inaugural Purpose Awards, an expansion from the Streamy Awards.

== Personal life ==
He married Jordan Burns in August 2000 and divorced in December 2011. Burns became engaged to The Know host Ashley Jenkins in early 2016. They married in June 2019.

Burns has three sons and one daughter.

He mainly resided in Austin, Texas, after briefly spending time in Los Angeles, California. When Burns announced his resignation from Rooster Teeth on June 11, 2020, he also announced he was moving away from the United States. He has since moved away from public life and has kept his family's current location private, until December 27, 2023, when he revealed on a podcast that they moved to Scotland.

Rooster Teeth had maintained a first-look deal on his projects.

He is a member of the International Academy of Web Television.

== Filmography ==
=== Web ===
Year	Title	Role	Notes
2003–2020	Red vs. Blue	Church, Lopez, Vic, O'Malley, Red Zealot, Lorenzo (voices)	Also creator, writer, director and producer
2004–2006, 2015	The Strangerhood	Griggs, Tovar (voices)	Also co-creator, writer, director and producer
2005	P.A.N.I.C.S.	Bravo 1, Alpha Team Commander (voices)	Also producer
2008	Supreme Surrender	—N/a	Writer and producer
2009	Captain Dynamic	—N/a	Creator, writer and producer
2009–present	Rooster Teeth Shorts	Himself	Also co-creator, writer and producer
2010–present	Immersion	Himself (host)	
2011–present	Rooster Teeth Animated Adventures	Himself (voice)	
2012–2013	The Gauntlet	Himself (host)	
2012	A Simple Walk Into Mordor	—N/a	Executive producer
2013	Video Game High School	Board Member	Episode: "Welcome to Varsity"
2013	Chris Hardwick's All-Star Celebrity Bowling	Himself	Episode: "Nerdist vs. Rooster Teeth"
2013–present	RWBY	Taiyang Xiao Long, Detective #1 (voices)	Also executive producer
2014	YouTubers React	Himself	2 episodes
2014	Ten Little Roosters	Burnie	Also executive producer
2014–2015	X-Ray and Vav	—N/a	Executive producer
2015–present	Million Dollars, But...	Himself (host)	
2015	Rooster Teeth Entertainment System	Guest	Also executive producer
2016	Death Battle	Epsilon (voice)	Episode: "The Meta VS Agent Carolina"
2016	Day 5	—N/a	Creator and executive producer
2016–2019	Camp Camp	—N/a	Executive producer; season 1–4
2016	Crunch Time	Special Agent	Also executive producer
2017–2018; 2021	RWBY Chibi	Taiyang Xiao Long (voice)	Also executive producer
2017	The Eleven Little Roosters	Burnardo Burnadicci	Also executive producer
2018	Nomad of Nowhere	—N/a	Producer
2021	RWBY: Fairy Tales	Taiyang Xiao Long (voice)	Episode: The Warrior in the Woods
2022	RWBY: Ice Queendom	Taiyang Xiao Long (voice)	English dub

=== Film ===
Year	Title	Roles	Notes
1997	The Schedule	—N/a	Co-director, writer and producer
2011	O Brave New World	Himself	Documentary
2012	Minecraft: The Story of Mojang	—N/a	Documentary; Executive producer
2015	Hit	Officer Harris	Short film
2015	The Outfield	Theo Rasmussen	
2015	Reunited	Newscaster #1	Short film
2015	Lazer Team	Hagan	Also co-writer and producer
2016	Slash	Mr. Snow	
2016	Connected	—N/a	Documentary; Executive producer
2016	The Meme Machine	Himself	Documentary; Also executive producer
2016	Why Him?	Himself	
2017	The Tattooist	—N/a	Documentary; Executive producer
2017	Haus of Pain	—N/a	Documentary; Executive producer
2017	Lazer Team 2	Hagan	Also co-writer and producer
2018	Blood Fest	—N/a	Executive producer
2019	A Heist With Markiplier	—N/a	Executive producer
2024	Red vs. Blue: Restoration	Epsilon (voice)	Also writer

=== Television ===
Year	Title	Roles	Notes
1994	Sneak Peak	Himself (host)	
2007	Code Monkeys	Blue Leader (voice)	Episode: "Super Prison Breakout"
2014, 2016	@midnight	Himself	2 episodes
2016	The Amazing Race	Himself (Contestant)	Season 28
2017	It's Always Sunny in Philadelphia	Paddy's Pub Customer	Episode: "The Gang Tends Bar"

=== Video games ===
Year	Title	Role
2007	Halo 3	Additional Voices
