= List of Rooster Teeth productions =

This is a list of productions produced and/or distributed by Austin-based productions studio Rooster Teeth, which operated from 2003 to 2024.

== Films ==
Release	Title	Budget	Gross	Genre	Notes
September 24, 2015	Lazer Team	US$2.5 million+ (amount raised via crowdfunding)	$1,337,445 (limited theatrical release)	Sci-fi comedy	Distributed digitally by YouTube Red and physically by Cinedigm on DVD/Blu-Ray. Crowdfunded via Indiegogo.
November 22, 2017	Lazer Team 2	TBA	TBA	Sci-fi comedy	Produced with and distributed by YouTube Red.
March 9, 2018 (SXSW)	Blood Fest	TBA	TBA	Horror comedy	Distributed by Rooster Teeth FIRST.
October 30, 2019	A Heist with Markiplier			Interactive sci-fi comedy	Produced by Rooster Teeth Studios; distributed by YouTube Originals.
April 4, 2022 May 2, 2022	In Space with Markiplier			Interactive sci-fi comedy	Produced by Rooster Teeth Studios; distributed by YouTube Originals.
April 25, 2023 (Part 1)	Justice League x RWBY: Super Heroes & Huntsmen			Superhero Action	Produced by Rooster Teeth Animation, Warner Bros Animation and DC Entertainment; distributed by Warner Bros Home Entertainment. (Note: as of December 6, 2024 to the present day, the film's distribution rights were transferred from Warner Bros. Home Entertainment to Viz Media with Warner Bros. via DC retaining the home media distribution rights to the movie)
October 17, 2023 (Part 2)	Justice League x RWBY: Super Heroes & Huntsmen			Superhero Action	Produced by Rooster Teeth Animation, Warner Bros Animation and DC Entertainment; distributed by Warner Bros Home Entertainment.
December 5, 2023 (The Complete Adventure)	Justice League x RWBY: Super Heroes & Huntsmen			Superhero Action	Produced by Rooster Teeth Animation, Warner Bros Animation and DC Entertainment; distributed by Warner Bros Home Entertainment.
May 7, 2024	Red vs. Blue: Restoration			Sci-fi comedy	Produced by Rooster Teeth Animation; distributed by Warner Bros Home Entertainment. Film conclusion of Red vs. Blue.

== Series ==
=== Final series ===
Premiere	Title	Division
September 2, 2008	Achievement Unlocked	Achievement Hunter
December 28, 2016	AH Animated	Achievement Hunter
November 8, 2014	Backwards Compatible	Rooster Teeth
June 6, 2017	Battle Buddies	Achievement Hunter
May 4, 2017	Best of Achievement Hunter	Achievement Hunter
January 23, 2017	Between the Games	Achievement Hunter
April 25, 2018	Board as Hell	Funhaus
June 11, 2016	Camp Camp	Rooster Teeth
December 28, 2017	Chaos Corner	Achievement Hunter
December 5, 2019	Chump	Rooster Teeth
March 15, 2016	DBX	Death Battle
December 7, 2010	Death Battle	Death Battle
January 4, 2015	Desk of Death Battle	Death Battle
May 5, 2015	Funhaus Plays GTA V	Funhaus
February 16, 2015	Gameplay	Funhaus
January 27, 2019	Gen:LOCK	Rooster Teeth
June 5, 2016	Google Trends Show	Funhaus
August 21, 2018	Hardcore Tabletop	Achievement Hunter
October 31, 2018	Haunter	Rooster Teeth
January 4, 2016	Inside Gaming Roundup	Inside Gaming
December 6, 2011	Let's Play	Achievement Hunter
July 19, 2018	Let's Roll	Achievement Hunter
N/A	Let's Test	Achievement Hunter
October 22, 2014	Let's Watch	Achievement Hunter
May 21, 2015	Million Dollars, But...	Rooster Teeth
N/A	Minimations	Rooster Teeth
N/A	Pilot Program	Rooster Teeth
N/A	Planet Slow Mo	Rooster Teeth
May 8, 2014	Play Pals	Achievement Hunter
January 20, 2011	Rage Quit	Achievement Hunter
April 1, 2003	Red vs. Blue	Rooster Teeth
April 29, 2019	Ready Set Show	Achievement Hunter
October 10, 2011	RT Animated Adventures	Rooster Teeth
June 6, 2017	RT Extras	Rooster Teeth
October 15, 2019	RT Inbox	Rooster Teeth
September 23, 2011	RT Life	Rooster Teeth
April 29, 2009	RT Shorts	Rooster Teeth
July 18, 2013	RWBY	Rooster Teeth
September 28, 2016	RouLetsPlay	Achievement Hunter
February 20, 2013	The Slow Mo Guys	Rooster Teeth
N/A	The Super Slow Show	Rooster Teeth
April 24, 2016	Theater Mode	Achievement Hunter
November 30, 2011	Things to Do in	Achievement Hunter
April 11, 2016	VR the Champions	Achievement Hunter
November 23, 2020	Watch Us Watch U	Funhaus

=== Past series ===
Premiere	Finale	Title	Division
June 7, 2007	July 4, 2007	1-800-Magic	Rooster Teeth
December 12, 2016	February 10, 2018	7 Days of 7 Days to Die	Achievement Hunter
December 16, 2011	August 15, 2012	A Look Back At	Achievement Hunter
December 8, 2012	January 30, 2013	A Simple Walk into Mordor	Rooster Teeth
January 30, 2017	April 17, 2017	A Spot of Science	Rooster Teeth
December 6, 2010	January 17, 2020	Achievement HORSE	Achievement Hunter
October 30, 2013	May 10, 2016	Achievement HUNT	Achievement Hunter
March 3, 2016	May 13, 2016	Achievement Hunter Hockey League	Achievement Hunter
October 16, 2014	May 9, 2016	Achievement Hunter VS The World	Achievement Hunter
September 24, 2015	September 12, 2016	AH-dventures	Achievement Hunter
June 25, 2010	January 24, 2012	AH Predicts	Achievement Hunter
March 21, 2017	June 3, 2019	Alternative Lifestyle	Sugar Pine 7
September 20, 2018	April 12, 2019	Arizona Circle	Funhaus
April 24, 2017	August 28, 2017	Barbara Vlogs	Rooster Teeth
August 22, 2020	January 1, 2021	Best Game Ever	Funhaus
		Best of Game Attack	Game Attack
March 4, 2016	March 7, 2020	Best of Funhaus	Funhaus
October 31, 2017	March 9, 2019	Bloopers	Sugar Pine 7
December 1, 2014	March 11, 2016	Bro Gaming	Game Kids
November 6, 2015	March 4, 2016	Buff Buddies	Rooster Teeth
January 27, 2017	January 23, 2018	Burnie Vlog	Rooster Teeth
February 26, 2009	March 12, 2009	Captain Dynamic	Rooster Teeth
February 23, 2019	February 23, 2019	Cheap Game, Cheap Life	Inside Gaming
May 12, 2014	January 5, 2016	Countdown	Achievement Hunter
September 8, 2018	December 1, 2018	Club Club	The Know
May 24, 2020	June 7, 2020	Co-Op Adventures	Funhaus
September 11, 2016	May 20, 2020	Crunch Time	Rooster Teeth
October 14, 2017	February 7, 2018	CRWBY: Behind the Episode	Rooster Teeth
June 29, 2016	September 24, 2017	Day 5	Rooster Teeth
		Day of Doom	Rooster Teeth
		Death Days	Game Attack
		Death Week	Game Attack
May 1, 2015	May 17, 2020	Demo Disk	Funhaus
June 4, 2015	October 29, 2018	Entertainment News	The Know
August 10, 2017	February 8, 2018	eSports Ejects	Funhaus
September 22, 2010	May 13, 2016	Fails of the Weak	Achievement Hunter
October 18, 2015	December 17, 2016	FIRST Member Vlog	Rooster Teeth
September 11, 2012	May 17, 2016	Five Facts	Achievement Hunter
July 28, 2014	April 19, 2016	Five Fun Facts	Rooster Teeth
		Forced Enjoyment	Achievement Hunter
		Four Play	Game Attack
August 12, 2015	July 9, 2016	Free Play	Rooster Teeth
March 8, 2016	July 7, 2020	Fullhaus	Funhaus
		Full Play	Achievement Hunter
October 22, 2015	July 30, 2020	Funhaus Animated	Funhaus
May 20, 2015	November 4, 2016	Funhaus on Let's Play	Funhaus
March 16, 2018	July 26, 2019	Funhaus Presents: Theater Mode	Funhaus
April 17, 2015	November 25, 2020	Funhaus Shorts	Funhaus
		Game Attack	ScrewAttack
		Game Attack VS Achievement Hunter	Game Attack
June 28, 2011	January 5, 2017	Game Fails	Achievement Hunter
		Game Kids	Achievement Hunter
March 23, 2012	February 14, 2014	Game Night	Achievement Hunter
May 7, 2015	January 9, 2019	Game News	The Know
April 8, 2011	September 12, 2019	Game Time	Rooster Teeth
October 11, 2018	March 21, 2019	Gaming Weekly	Funhaus
June 15, 2019	August 10, 2019	Get Fact!	Rooster Teeth
October 29, 2013	August 28, 2018	GO!	Achievement Hunter
November 13, 2018	November 16, 2018	GORQ's Quest	Rooster Teeth
September 25, 2014	April 21, 2016	Grab Bag	Achievement Hunter
December 12, 2015	May 31, 2016	Great Levels in Gaming	Achievement Hunter
July 26, 2014	April 29, 2016	Happy Hour	Rooster Teeth
June 10, 2016	August 15, 2018	Heroes & Halfwits	Achievement Hunter
October 31, 2013	May 15, 2016	How To	Achievement Hunter
August 13, 2014	April 8, 2015	Imaginary Achievements	Achievement Hunter
April 5, 2010	August 3, 2017	Immersion	Rooster Teeth
November 18, 2015	April 19, 2020	In Review	Funhaus
February 14, 2019	January 5, 2021	Inside Gaming Daily	Inside Gaming
February 16, 2019	April 19, 2020	Inside Gaming Explains	Inside Gaming
August 8, 2019	December 26, 2020	Inside Gaming Features	Inside Gaming
February 14, 2019	November 9, 2020	Inside Gaming Reviews	Inside Gaming
April 26, 2020	November 15, 2020	Inside Gaming Special	Inside Gaming
March 20, 2015	January 20, 2016	Is It Good?	ScrewAttack
February 12, 2015	March 21, 2016	Kids Craft	Game Kids
December 1, 2014	January 13, 2016	Kids Play	Game Kids
April 1, 2020	May 25, 2020	Last Laugh	Funhaus
		Leaderboard	The Know
November 6, 2016	January 15, 2017	Let Me Clarify	Rooster Teeth
April 26, 2017	May 3, 2017	Let's Play Live: Life on Tour	Achievement Hunter
January 20, 2020	March 23, 2020	Lights, Camera, Trash!	Funhaus
		Mario Party Saturday	Game Attack
December 29, 2017	April 16, 2020	Master and Apprentice	Rooster Teeth
August 18, 2014	August 12, 2015	MegaCraft	Achievement Hunter
May 31, 2018	July 14, 2019	Murder Room	Rooster Teeth
September 9, 2010	November 6, 2017	Music Videos	Rooster Teeth
August 17, 2017	February 23, 2019	Music Videos	Sugar Pine 7
November 2, 2020	January 4, 2021	My Abandonware	Funhaus
July 20, 2012	August 24, 2012	Nature Town	Rooster Teeth
March 11, 2020	May 29, 2020	No Idea	Funhaus
March 23, 2018	September 28, 2018	Nomad of Nowhere	Rooster Teeth
		One Minute Melee	ScrewAttack
May 1, 2015	April 30, 2019	Open Haus	Funhaus
December 20, 2008	September 25, 2009	Pajamachievements	Achievement Hunter
September 30, 2005	October 19, 2005	PANICS	Rooster Teeth
November 22, 2011	January 6, 2012	Past Cast	Rooster Teeth
August 1, 2015	July 1, 2016	Presented with Comment	Achievement Hunter
August 20, 2012	December 17, 2012	Quick Bits	Achievement Hunter
August 13, 2015	March 31, 2016	Reasons We Love	ScrewAttack
		Reasons We Hate	ScrewAttack
July 13, 2020	August 3, 2020	Recorded by Arizal	Rooster Teeth
December 7, 2015	January 28, 2016	Rest Of	Funhaus
		Retro Active	Achievement Hunter
February 24, 2019	May 1, 2019	Roasted	Inside Gaming
August 30, 2013	March 14, 2014	RT News	Rooster Teeth
May 17, 2013	February 3, 2018	RT Podcast Let's Play	Rooster Teeth
August 12, 2011	June 8, 2015	RT Recap	Rooster Teeth
April 22, 2015	April 22, 2015	RT Showcase	Rooster Teeth
December 31, 2015	May 24, 2016	RT Specials	Rooster Teeth
December 16, 2004	July 1, 2016	RT Sponsor Cut	Rooster Teeth
June 11, 2019	November 2, 2019	RT Twitch	Rooster Teeth
May 8, 2016	August 25, 2018	RWBY Chibi	Rooster Teeth
October 18, 2017	February 2, 2019	RWBY Rewind	Rooster Teeth
January 11, 2021	February 15, 2021	Ryan's Bargain Bin	Funhaus
October 3, 2016	May 17, 2017	Schooled	Achievement Hunter
May 21, 2016	August 1, 2016	ScrewAttack Illustrated	ScrewAttack
		ScrewAttack's Top 10	ScrewAttack
February 25, 2017	April 1, 2017	Sex Swing	Rooster Teeth
December 19, 2014	August 16, 2019	Shenanigans	Achievement Hunter
December 1, 2014	March 28, 2016	Sims Sisters	Game Kids
September 13, 2014	November 12, 2015	Social Disorder	Rooster Teeth
February 4, 2015	June 19, 2018	Specials	The Know
June 19, 2008	September 10, 2008	Stroyent	Rooster Teeth
November 6, 2014	June 30, 2015	Sunday Driving	Achievement Hunter
June 18, 2008	July 2, 2008	Supreme Surrender	Rooster Teeth
		Tap That App	Game Attack
August 20, 2015	May 25, 2018	Tech and Science News	The Know
November 4, 2014	December 23, 2014	Ten Little Roosters	Rooster Teeth
		TESTING!	Achievement Hunter
December 15, 2018	March 3, 2019	That Sketch	Sugar Pine 7
		The #1 Show	ScrewAttack
January 12, 2012	March 26, 2016	The Best Ever	ScrewAttack
January 17, 2017	March 7, 2017	The Eleven Little Roosters	Rooster Teeth
November 1, 2012	November 24, 2013	The Gauntlet	Rooster Teeth
		The Know It All	The Know
		The Lab	Rooster Teeth
October 18, 2004	October 3, 2015	The Strangerhood	Rooster Teeth
March 14, 2019	April 4, 2019	The Weird Place	Achievement Hunter
April 12, 2011	August 14, 2015	This Is...	Achievement Hunter
January 9, 2019	August 4, 2019	Top 10	Inside Gaming
		Tournament	Achievement Hunter
April 24, 2012	November 4, 2011	Trials Files	Achievement Hunter
July 30, 2020	July 29, 2021	Transformers: War for Cybertron Trilogy	Netflix
May 2, 2012	October 17, 2013	Trials PIG	Achievement Hunter
July 20, 2017	September 14, 2017	Tuesday Night Game Fight	Rooster Teeth
August 1, 2016	September 14, 2017	Twits and Crits	Funhaus
September 28, 2017	January 18, 2018	Twits and Crits: The League of Extraordinary Jiremen	Funhaus
August 18, 2009	July 29, 2016	Video Game Vault	ScrewAttack
	January 18, 2017	VS	Achievement Hunter
		What Do You Know?	Rooster Teeth
January 16, 2015	September 4, 2016	Who Is?	ScrewAttack
November 11, 2019	January 13, 2020	Worst Games Ever	Funhaus
November 27, 2014	December 13, 2015	X-Ray and Vav	Rooster Teeth
May 5, 2015	November 16, 2020	Your Comments	Funhaus
March 4, 2010	May 17, 2021	AHWU	Achievement Hunter

=== Podcasts and Past Shows ===
Premiere	Finale	Title	Division
September 30, 2015	November 2, 2015	#RT-ES	Rooster Teeth
September 2, 2016		Always Open	Rooster Teeth
		Available Now	ScrewAttack
October 31, 2017		Beyond the Pine	Sugar Pine 7
November 3, 2016		Death Battle Cast	Death Battle
February 7, 2015		Dude Soup	Funhaus
June 22, 2016	May 8, 2019	Dude Soup: Post Show	Funhaus
December 21, 2016	April 29, 2017	Enjoy the Show	Rooster Teeth
June 3, 2020		F**k Face	Achievement Hunter
October 18, 2019		Face Jam	Achievement Hunter
May 7, 2015	May 15, 2016	Fan Art	Funhaus
October 22, 2016		Fan Service	Rooster Teeth
September 2, 2016		Filmhaus	Funhaus
July 1, 2015	October 23, 2015	Funhaus Answers Questions	Funhaus
April 15, 2017	February 2, 2019	Glitch Please	The Know
September 16, 2017	February 1, 2019	Glitch Please: New Game+	The Know
October 10, 2019		Good Morning from Hell	Rooster Teeth
May 1, 2020	April 23, 2021	I Have Notes	Rooster Teeth
February 28, 2020	January 1, 2021	Inside Gaming Podcast!	Inside Gaming
July 18, 2017	September 3, 2017	Know Your Thrones	The Know
October 8, 2019	July 11, 2020	Morning Haus	Funhaus
November 7, 2014		On the Spot	Rooster Teeth
December 6, 2015		Off Topic	Achievement Hunter
February 14, 2017	August 17, 2017	Relationship Goals	Rooster Teeth
December 9, 2008	April 22, 2024	Rooster Teeth Podcast	Rooster Teeth
August 6, 2014	January 7. 2015	Screen Play	The Know
April 4, 2020	October 2, 2020	Send News	Inside Gaming
February 15, 2006	October 11, 2016	SideScrollers	ScrewAttack
August 27, 2015	October 30, 2018	Sportsball	Rooster Teeth
May 4, 2021		Tales From The Stinky Dragon	Rooster Teeth
October 19, 2018	November 16, 2018	The Bungalow	Rooster Teeth
May 30, 2013	December 30, 2016	The Patch	The Know
April 24, 2015	September 10, 2016	The Patch Game Club	The Know
September 5, 2019		This Just Internet	Achievement Hunter
		Try Hard	Game Attack

=== Documentaries ===
Release	Title	Genre	Notes
September 14, 2015	Let's Play Live: The Documentary	Documentary	Distributed by Rooster Teeth First.
April 15, 2016	Connected	Documentary	Distributed by Rooster Teeth First.
July 8, 2016 (Part 1); July 15, 2016 (Part 2)	The World's Greatest Head Massage: An ASMR Journey	Documentary	Distributed by Rooster Teeth First. Released in two parts.
December 16, 2016	The Meme Machine: What Happens When the Internet Chooses You	Documentary	Distributed by Rooster Teeth First.
March 24, 2017	The Tattooist	Documentary	Distributed by Rooster Teeth First.
April 28, 2017	Haus of Pain	Documentary	Distributed by Rooster Teeth First.
August 1, 2017	Unconventional	Documentary	Distributed by Rooster Teeth First.
January 26, 2018	Becoming Jessica Nigri	Documentary	Distributed by Rooster Teeth First.
April 20, 2018	Why We're Here: 15 Years of Rooster Teeth	Documentary	Distributed by Rooster Teeth First.
November 2, 2018	Common Ground	Documentary	Distributed by Rooster Teeth First.
March 1, 2019	Waiting for the Punchline	Documentary	Distributed by Rooster Teeth First.

== Discography ==
=== Releases ===
Year	Artist	Title	Type
2003	Trocadero	Roses Are Red, Violets Are Blue	Studio album
2006	The Uggos	Crazy Zoo: Music From The Strangerhood	Soundtrack album
2009	Trocadero	Ghosts That Linger	Studio album
2010	Jeff Williams	Red vs. Blue: Revelation Soundtrack	Soundtrack album
2011	Jeff Williams	Red vs. Blue Season 9 Soundtrack	Soundtrack album
2012	Trocadero	Flying By Wire	Studio album
2012	Jeff Williams	Red vs. Blue Season 10 Soundtrack	Soundtrack album
2013	Jeff Williams	RWBY Volume 1 Soundtrack	Soundtrack album
2014	Trocadero	When We're Together	Live album
2014	Trocadero	Red vs. Blue Season 12 Soundtrack	Soundtrack album
2014	Jeff Williams	RWBY Volume 2 Soundtrack	Soundtrack album
2015	Trocadero & David Levy	Red vs. Blue Season 13 Soundtrack	Soundtrack album
2016	Jeff Williams	RWBY Volume 3 Soundtrack	Soundtrack album
2016	Various Artists	Camp Camp Soundtrack	Soundtrack album
2017	Jeff Williams	RWBY Volume 4 Soundtrack	Soundtrack album
2018	Trocadero & David Levy	Red vs. Blue Season 14 Soundtrack	Soundtrack album
2018	Jeff Williams	RWBY Volume 5 Soundtrack	Soundtrack album
2019	Jeff Williams	RWBY Volume 6 Soundtrack	Soundtrack album
2020	Jeff Williams	RWBY Volume 7 Soundtrack	Soundtrack album

=== Music videos ===
Title	Artist	Year	Album
"Odds Are"	Barenaked Ladies	2013	Grinning Streak
"Did I Say That Out Loud?"	Barenaked Ladies	2014	Grinning Streak
"Say What You Want"	Barenaked Ladies	2015	Silverball
"Lookin' Up"	Barenaked Ladies	2017	Fake Nudes

== Publications ==
Title	Author	Release date
RT Comic	Griffon Ramsey and Luke McKay	August 24, 2006 - August 20, 2011
Red vs. Blue: The Ultimate Fan Guide	Eddy Rivas and Burnie Burns	November 17, 2015

== Video games published ==
Title	Platform	Developer	Release date
Rooster Teeth vs. Zombiens	Microsoft Windows, Mac OS X, iOS, Android	Team Chaos	November 13, 2014
RWBY: Grimm Eclipse	Xbox One, PlayStation 4, Microsoft Windows, Mac OS X	Rooster Teeth Games	July 5, 2016
Bendy and the Ink Machine	PlayStation 4, Xbox One, Nintendo Switch	TheMeatly Games	2018
Vicious Circle	Microsoft Windows	Rooster Teeth Games	August 13, 2019
RWBY: Arrowfell	PlayStation 5, PlayStation 4, Xbox One, Microsoft Windows, Xbox Series X and Series S, Nintendo Switch	WayForward, Limited Run Games, Arc System Works, Rooster Teeth Games	November 14, 2022

== Subsidiaries ==
Foundation	Closure	Name	Type
July 28, 2008	September 18, 2023	Achievement Hunter	Comedy, Gaming, Let's Plays, Walk-through's
August 9, 2010	April 13, 2017	Let's Play Community	Gaming
June 29, 2011	January 6, 2017	Game Fails	Gaming
June 1, 2014	February 14, 2019	The Know	Gaming News
February 14, 2006	February 4, 2019	ScrewAttack	Internet Entertainment
April 16, 2013		Let's Plays	Let's Plays
December 1, 2014	March 28, 2016	Game Kids	Let's Plays
February 5, 2015		Funhaus	Comedy, Let's Plays
October 9, 2016	May 1, 2017	Game Attack	Comedy, Gaming
January 11, 2018	May 30, 2019	Sugar Pine 7	Mockumentary
February 4, 2019		Death Battle	Internet Entertainment
February 14, 2019		Inside Gaming	Gaming News
