= Ghosts That Linger =

Studio album by Trocadero
- Released: 21 November 2009
- Genre: Alternative rock
- Length: 49:36
- Label: Rooster Teeth Productions
- Producer: Trocadero

Trocadero chronology
| Roses Are Red, Violets Are Blue (2004) | Ghosts That Linger (2009) | Flying by Wire (2012) |

Ghosts That Linger is an album released in November 2009 by the alternative rock band Trocadero. The album was independently released, with manufacturing and distribution by Rooster Teeth Productions. Several tracks are used in episodes in Red vs. Blue: The Blood Gulch Chronicles, and some are also used as theme songs for the Red vs. Blue Recollections.

== Production ==
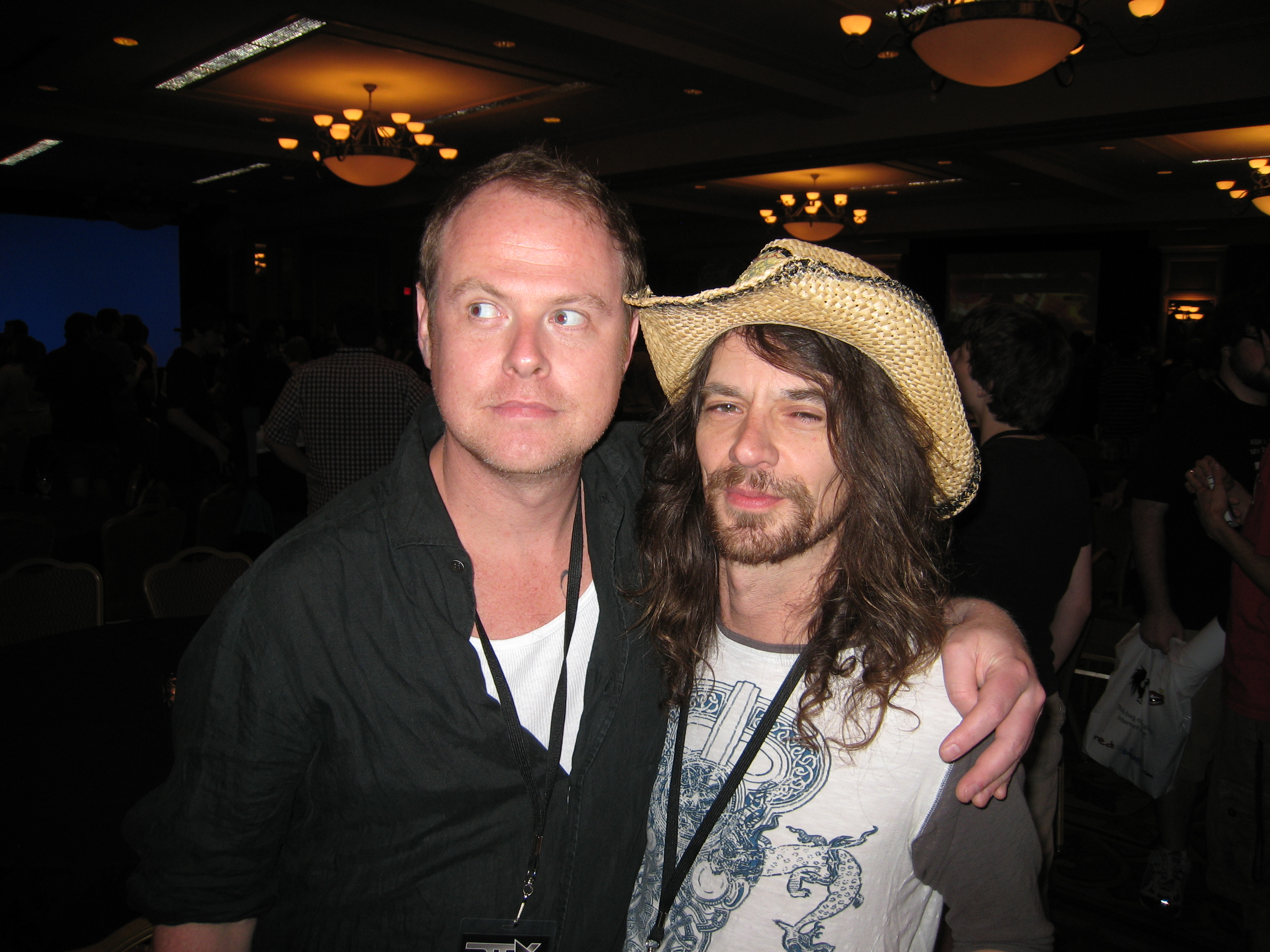
Nico Audy-Rowland and Jeff Williams

According to the CD jacket:

- Nico Audy-Rowland wrote the music and words, sang, and played Danelectro, and Yairi baritone guitars, Dean Banjo; Telecaster Deluxe, Glockenspiel, Moog Taurus pedals and Opus 3, JD 990 and SH101.
- Martha Marin sang and arranged harmonies and extra lyrics on 2, 4, 5, 7, 10, 11, and 12, and wrote the melody she and Nico Audy-Rowland sing on 6.
- Jeff Williams played and arranged the Moog Opus 3, Kurzweil 2600, and Wurlitzer EP200 keyboards on 1, 2, 4, and 13.
- Brandon Erdos played drums on 1, 2, 4, 12, and 13, and helped with arrangements on 2, 4, 12, and 13.
- Susan Hsia co-wrote, sang, and played Casio and Moog Opus 3 keyboards on 12 and 13.
- Steve Scully played drums on 5, 6, 7, 9, and 19.
- Christine Wu wrote, arranged, performed, and recorded the strings on 7.
- Ted Atkatz played the bass drum, cymbal, and triangle on 8. His playing also appears on 5, 7, 16, and 17.
- Clayton Scoble played air organ, Yamaha guitar and PSS-570 keyboard on 7, and Telecaster Deluxe on 9.
- Cory Kawabata was the filter queen on the Roland SH101 on 9.
- E. Lehnartz wrote the keyboard riff for 14.
- Paul Simonoff played Precision bass on 3.
- Nozomi Ikeda translated the chorus of 2 into Japanese.
- Jeff Williams at Blue Leopard Audio tracked and mixed 2, 4, and 10.
- Jon Lupfer at Q Division tracked and mixed 12 and 13.
- Steve Scully at Yellowsound tracked drums and mixed 1, 3, 5, 6, 9, and 19.
- Nico Audy-Rowland recorded and mixed all other sounds at Lune Studios.
- Mastered by Ian Kennedy at New Alliance.
- Design and Art by Heather Cristofaro.
- Cover photograph by Lucy Pringle.
- All songs published by Trocadero Mass Music (ASCAP).

== Track listing ==
1. Return – 1:38
2. Colors – 3:25
3. Daydream No.19 – 2:44
4. Good Fight – 5:26
5. Keep Moving – 2:22
6. Heart with Wings – 3:30
7. Goldmine Blues – 3:54
8. First Wave – 3:45
9. Saline – 1:33
10. Alien Champion – 2:13
11. Shiny Thing – 1:15
12. Champion – 4:18
13. 35mm Man – 4:14
14. Blues for Fairfax – 1:42
15. (When) Your Middle Name is Danger – 2:05
16. Big Prize – 0:45
17. Another One Down – 2:17
18. Nightmare (Again) – 0:32
19. Outpost Sunset – 2:10
