= Roses Are Red, Violets Are Blue (album) =

Studio album by Trocadero
- Released: 1 Sep 2004
- Genre: Alternative rock
- Length: 45:25
- Label: Rooster Teeth Productions
- Producer: Trocadero

Trocadero chronology
Roses Are Red, Violets Are Blue (2004)	Ghosts That Linger (2009)

Roses Are Red, Violets Are Blue is the debut studio album by the American alternative rock band Trocadero, released on September 1, 2004. It contains "songs from and inspired by Red vs. Blue: The Blood Gulch Chronicles". The album was independently released, with manufacturing and distribution handled by Rooster Teeth Productions.

Several distinct musical techniques were implemented on the album. Most songs use polyphonic lead vocals, usually between Nico Audy-Rowland and Wendy Mittelstadt. Many of the electric instruments have a recognizable reverberation effect.

The album contains genre elements influenced by the blues, disco, spirituals, western narrative, and types of rock.

== Track listing ==
1. "Intro" (Audy-Rowland) – 0:18
2. "Blood Gulch Blues" (Audy-Rowland/Mittelstadt) – 2:24
3. "Steady Ride (Gun Metal Green)" (Audy-Rowland/Mittelstadt) – 4:24
4. "Spiritual" (Audy-Rowland/Mittelstadt) – 2:42
5. "No One" (Audy-Rowland/Mittelstadt/Erdos) – 2:49
6. "Funny Farm" (Audy-Rowland/Mittelstadt) – 5:10
7. "A Girl Named Tex" (Audy-Rowland) – 3:27
8. "Punch It" (Audy-Rowland) – 0:38
9. "Space Invader" (Audy-Rowland/Mittelstadt/Erdos) – 3:32
10. "(617)" (Audy-Rowland/Hsia/Erdos) – 3:32
11. "Superhero" (Audy-Rowland/Hsia/Erdos) – 3:34
12. "Vale Deah" (Audy-Rowland/Mittelstadt/Erdos) – 3:01
13. "All as One" (Audy-Rowland/Hsia/Erdos) – 4:09
14. "Oh Five!" (Audy-Rowland) – 0:51
15. "Half Life" (Audy-Rowland) – 4:39
16. "BATE" (Audy-Rowland/Mittelstadt/Hsia/Erdos) – 0:26

== Personnel ==
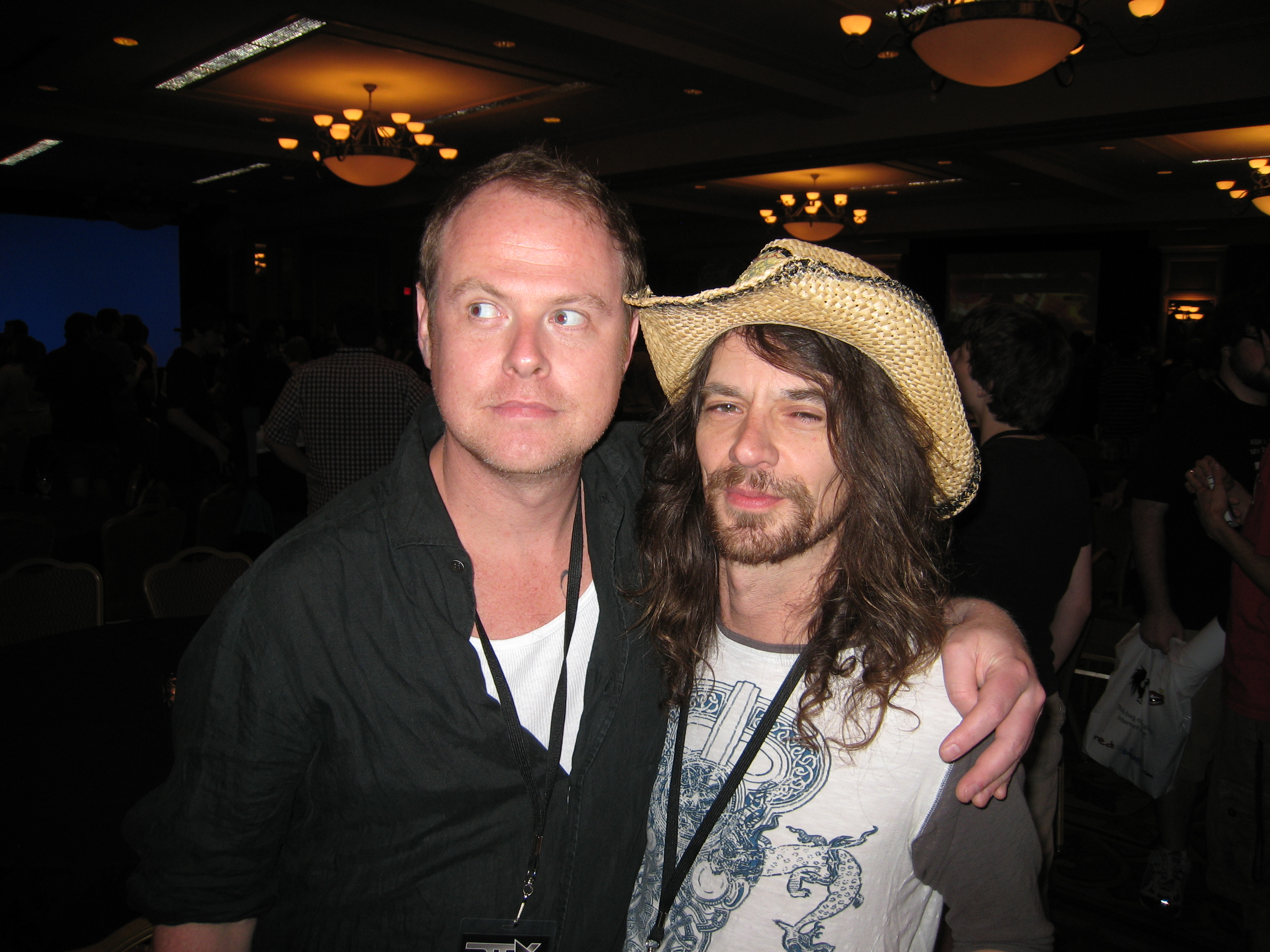
Nico Audy-Rowland and Jeff Williams

=== Trocadero ===
- Nico Audy-Rowland – vocals, Danelectro, Yairi baritone guitars, Dean banjo; keyboards and pedals on "A Girl Named Tex", drums on "Steady Ride (Gun Metal Green)"
- Wendy Mittelstadt – vocals, Moog, Casio, Kurzweil keyboards, Wurlitzer EP, piano, violin, viola; string arrangement on "Half Life"
- Brandon Erdos – drums, percussion, Moog Taurus pedals

=== Guest musicians ===
- Jeff Williams (under the pseudonym "Philadelphia Telepants") – Fender guitar solo on "Steady Ride (Gun Metal Green)"
- Sandy Casey – chorus vocals on "A Girl Named Tex"
- Susan Hsia – vocals, Moog Opus, Casio keyboards on "Superhero"
- Karen Langlie – cello on "Half Life"
