= Flying by Wire =

Studio album by Trocadero
- Released: 7 July 2012
- Genre: Alternative rock
- Length: 42:00
- Label: Rooster Teeth Productions
- Producer: Trocadero

Trocadero chronology
Ghosts That Linger (2009)	Flying by Wire (2012)	When We're Together (2014)

Flying by Wire is an album released in July 2012 by the alternative rock band Trocadero. The album was independently released, with manufacturing and distribution by Rooster Teeth Productions. Most tracks on the album are used in episodes of Red vs. Blue.

== Track listing ==
1. Fifty – 1:55
2. Bolt – 3:48
3. The Man in Red – 4:24
4. Hero Superstar – 3:34
5. Faraway – 1:42
6. Best Girl – 4:35
7. Dancing Bull – 2:32
8. So Good – 1:17
9. Routine King – 1:01
10. Shotgun – 3:03
11. Searchlight – 1:27
12. Bloody Mary Mix – 3:25
13. When We Were Soldiers – 2:31
14. Third Wave – 2:58
15. Noobs Rush In – 0:40
16. Reverie Six (and Change) – 3:30

== Personnel ==
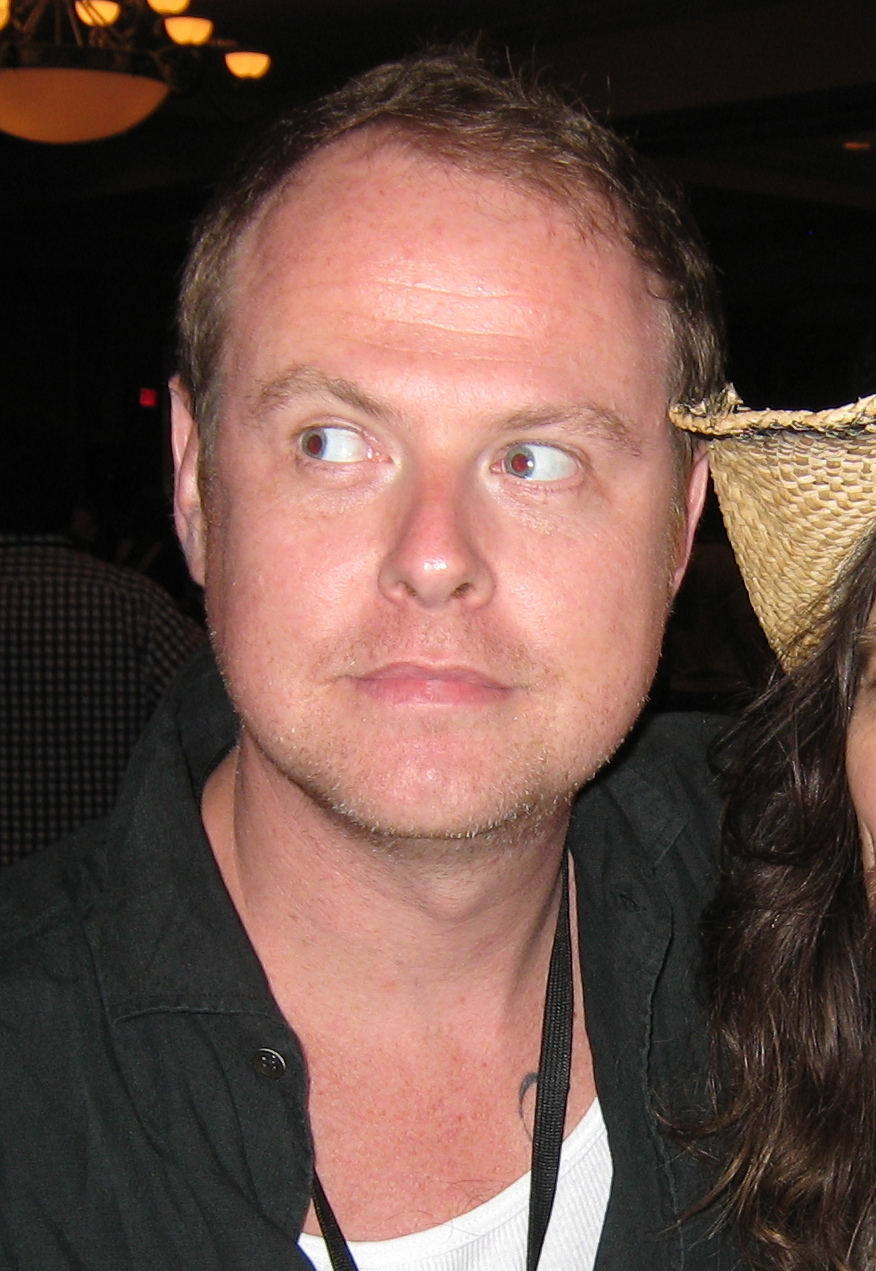
Nico Audy-Rowland of Trocadero

Adapted from the CD jacket:

Trocadero

- Nico Audy-Rowland – music and words, vocals, Danelectro and Yairi baritone guitars, Dean banjo, Fender Tele Deluxe, Roland JD-990, Animoog, and Moog Taurus pedals.
- Violet Heart – arrangements, extra lyrics, vocals, Moog Opus 3 and Wurlitzer EP200 keyboards, and PRS guitar.
- Steve Scully – arrangements, drums, percussion, vocals.

Musicians

- Ted Atkatz – percussion
- Brandon Erdos – percussion
- Cory Kawabata – vocals
- Martha Marin – vocals
- Hannah Mickunas – vocals
- Fender Q – Skylarker guitar
- Christine Wu – strings
- Sample from "Dancing Bull" courtesy of Ode Records

Production

- Production by Trocadero
- Violet Heart at Blackheart Studio tracked keyboards and vocals.
- Steve Scully at Yellowsound tracked drums, and mixed 02, 03, 06, 10, and 12.
- Jon Lupfer at Q Division mixed "Hero Superstar".
- Nico Audy-Rowland at Studio 2600 tracked guitars and vocals, and mixed all other songs.
- Mastered by Dave Locke at JP Masters in Boston, MA.

== Songs featured in Red vs. Blue ==
- "Fifty" is used during the opening sequence of the first episode of Red vs. Blue: Season 9.
- "Searchlight" is used in multiple episodes of Red vs. Blue: Recreation.
- "Bloody Mary Mix" is used in episode 21 of Red vs. Blue: Season 10.
- "Noobs Rush In" is used in episode 39.
- "The Man in Red" was intended by Trocadero to be a sister song to "A Girl Named Tex", as it focuses on Sarge's upbringing.
