= Joel Heyman =

American actor (born 1971)

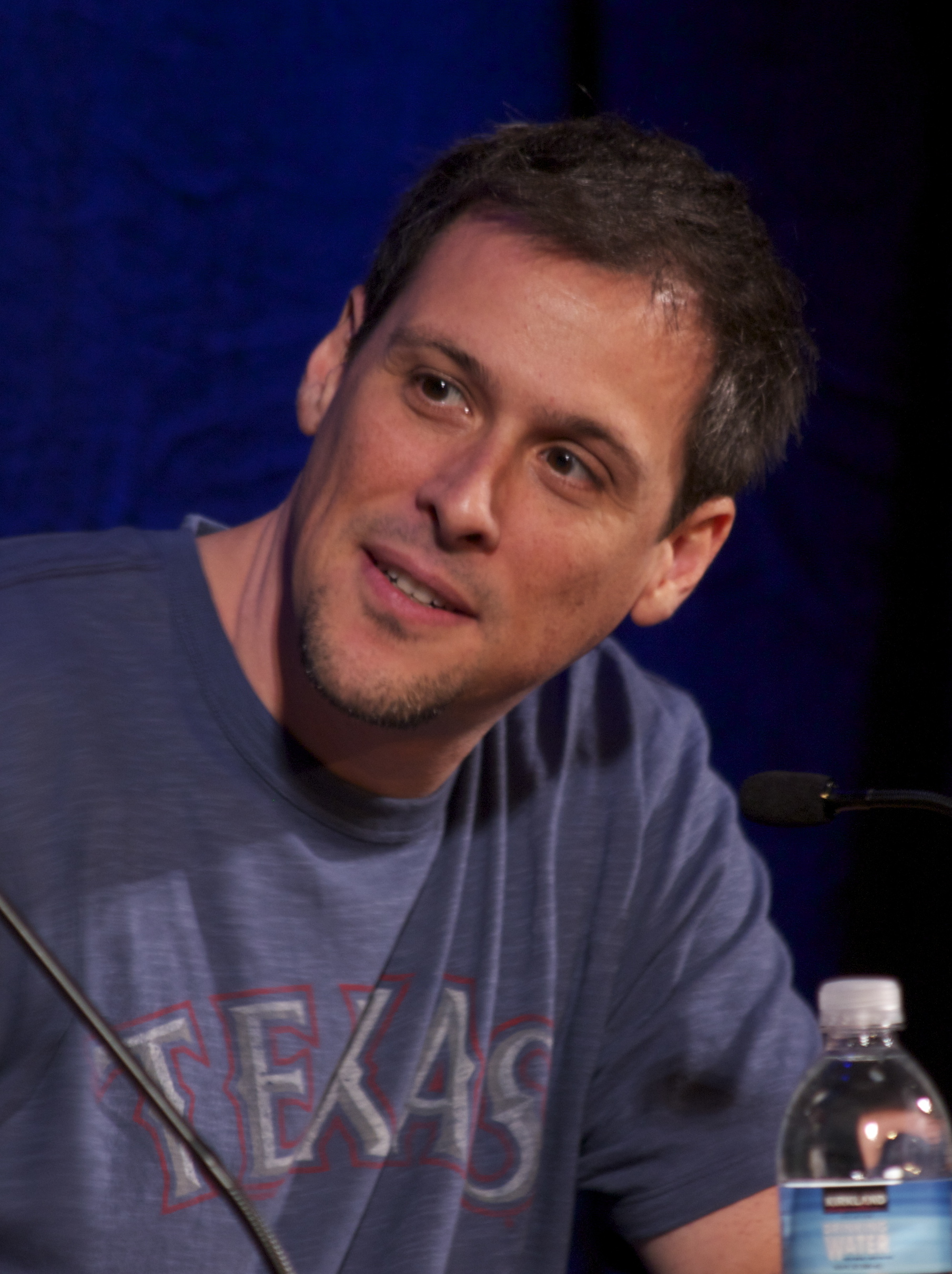
- Joel Heyman at PAX Prime 2012
- Born: Joel Pearce Heyman; September 16, 1971 (age 54)
- Education: University of Texas at Austin (BFA)
- Occupations: Film producer, writer, actor
- Years active: 1997–present
- Employer: Rooster Teeth (2003–2019)

Joel Pearce Heyman (born September 16, 1971) is an American actor, best known for voicing Michael J. Caboose in the Rooster Teeth web series Red vs. Blue from 2003 until 2020. He co-founded Rooster Teeth with Burnie Burns, Matt Hullum, Geoff Ramsey and Gus Sorola and has appeared in their other projects, including The Strangerhood (2004–2006, 2015), The Gauntlet (2012) and RWBY (2013–2020).

== Career ==
Heyman's credited roles include Private Michael J. Caboose and O'Malley in the popular Rooster Teeth web series Red vs. Blue, Wade in The Strangerhood and Bartholomew Oobleck in RWBY. In addition to his involvement in machinima, he starred in The Schedule, a live-action film written and directed by Burnie Burns, the creator of Red vs. Blue, and has also appeared on shows such as Friends, Angel, The Inside and Alias. He has reprised his Red vs. Blue role as a Blue Prison Guard in the G4 show Code Monkeys and had a minor role in Halo 3 as a UNSC Marine. He was also a recurring member of The Rooster Teeth Podcast (previously The Drunk Tank) and hosted a series of Rooster Teeth gaming videos called How To, where he and fellow employee Adam Ellis play various video games while under the effects of alcohol. He had a cameo role in the film Lazer Team, playing a news reporter.

On June 1, 2020, Joel replied to a user on Twitter that he had been "laid off" by Rooster Teeth for personal reasons with the company.

== Personal life ==
Heyman is a graduate of the University of Texas at Austin, where he received a Bachelor of Fine Arts degree in drama production. He has recently moved back to Los Angeles, California, where he lived during the first season of Red vs. Blue.

== Filmography ==
=== Film ===
Year	Title	Role	Notes
1997	The Schedule	Jacob	
2001	The Quickie	Bartender	
2002	Simone	Male	
2007	Asylum	Craig	
2015	Lazer Team	Reporter	
2017	Lazer Team 2	Reporter	

=== Television ===
Year	Title	Role	Notes
1999	Friends	Guy on Plane, Guy Watching Game	2 episodes
2000	Angel	Vampire in Rug	Episode: "Blind Date"
2001	Star Trek: Enterprise	Crewman	2 episodes
2005	The Inside	Paramedic #2	Episode: "Aidan"
2006	Criminal Minds	Man on the Street, Detective #1	2 episodes
2007	Code Monkeys	Head Guard	Voice, episode: "Super Prison Breakout"
2021–2025	9-1-1: Lone Star	911 Operator Joel	7 episodes

=== Web ===
Year	Title	Role	Notes
2003–2020	Red vs. Blue	Caboose, O'Malley	Voice; also producer
2004–2006, 2015	The Strangerhood	Wade	Voice
2009	Captain Dynamic	Himself	Miniseries
2009–2020	Rooster Teeth Shorts	Himself	
2012–2013	The Gauntlet	Himself	
2013	Video Game High School	Board Member	Episode: "Welcome to Varsity"
2013–2016	RWBY	Bartholomew Oobleck, Vale Police Detective	Voice
2016	Immersion	Game Over	Voice, episode: "Metal Gear Solid in Real Life"
2016–2020	Day 5	Bill	
2016	Crunch Time	Man in Tux	Episode: "The Party of the Century"
2017	Eleven Little Roosters	Joel Joelle	
2017–2018; 2021	RWBY Chibi	Bartholomew Oobleck	

=== Video games ===
Year	Title	Role
2007	Halo 3	Additional Voices
2012	Halo 4	Additional Voices
2016	RWBY: Grimm Eclipse	Bartholomew Oobleck
