= Shannon McCormick =

American film and voice actor (born 1971)

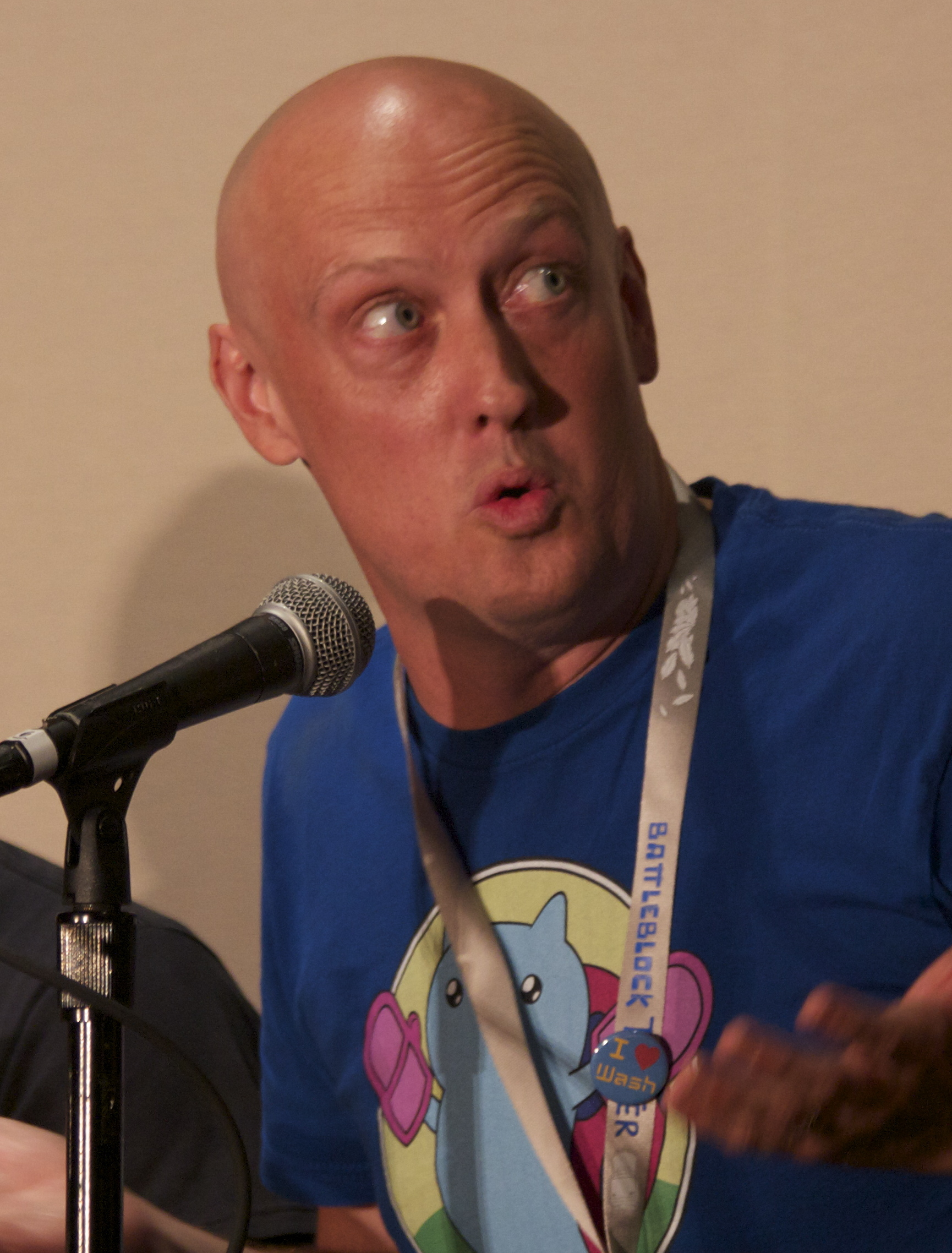
- McCormick at RTX 2013.
- Born: August 19, 1971 (age 54); Atlantic, Iowa, U.S.
- Occupation: Actor
- Years active: 1995–present

Shannon McCormick (born August 19, 1971) is an American film and voice actor. He is known for his work with Rooster Teeth, voicing Agent Washington in Red vs. Blue, Professor Ozpin in RWBY, and the Quartermaster in Camp Camp.

His other roles include Kuroudo Akabane in GetBackers, Masahiro Tamano / Tanma in Wedding Peach and Arkillo, John Constantine, Shazam, and the Riddler in DC Universe Online. McCormick also has experience as an improv comedian.

== Filmography ==
=== Film ===
Year	Title	Role	Notes
1997	Crackerjack 2	Bruno	
1998	Les Misérables	Redheaded Gendarme	
1998	Sleeping Dogs	Tippit	
1998	Act of War	Bradford	
2004	Eating in Cubes		Short film
2005	Fall to Grace	Coach Hawkins	
2005	Severance	Bum with Gloves	
2006	The Cassidy Kids	Gary	
2007	Flatland: The Movie	Triangle Guard #1 (voice)	Short film
2008	The Whistler	Policeman	Short film
2009	Holy Hell	Repressive Preacher	
2010	Ultimate Guide to Flight	Lee Dillman	
2012	Cinema Six	Taffy Customer	
2012	Pictures of Superheroes	Eric	
2015	Last Girl Standing	Evan	
2015	Christmas Dreams	Snowflake	
2015	Lazer Team	Creepy Orderly	
2023	Justice League x RWBY: Super Heroes & Huntsmen, Part One	Professor Ozpin (voice)	Direct-to-video
2024	Red vs. Blue Restoration	Agent Washington (voice)	Direct-to-Video

=== Television ===
Year	Title	Role	Notes
1995	Wedding Peach	Masahiro Tamano / Tanma (voice)	English dub
2002–2003	GetBackers	Kuroudo Akabane (voice)	English dub
2009	Breaking Bad	Tweaky Dude	Episode: "Over"
2021	Back Arrow	Back Arrow (voice)	English dub

=== Video games ===
Year	Title	Role
2011	DC Universe Online	Arkillo, John Constantine, Shazam, Riddler
2016	RWBY: Grimm Eclipse	Professor Ozpin

=== Web ===
Year	Title	Role	Notes
2007–present	Rooster Teeth Shorts	Himself	
2008–2020	Red vs. Blue	Agent Washington, Lopez 2.0, Agent Iowa (voices)	Also wrote "The Triplets" and "The "Mission"
2009	Project: Rant		
2012	BIT Parts	Debug	
2013–present	RWBY	Professor Ozpin (voice)	Character; volumes 1–3, voice; volume 4–present
2014	Ten Little Roosters	Shannon	Episode: "And Then There Were Nine"
2015	Immersion	Mike Hawk	
2016	Crunch Time	Vampire Dentist	Episode: "The Business"
2016–2017	Day 5	Dr. Abrams	
2016–2024	Camp Camp	Quartermaster, Quartersister, Almanac (voices)	
2016-2018; 2021	RWBY Chibi	Professor Ozpin (voice)	
2017	The Eleven Little Roosters	Vladimir Putin	
2017	Kings of Atlantis	Crabman the Cabmerian (voice)	Episode: "Crabman the Cabmerian"
2018	Nomad of Nowhere	Undertaker (voice)	
2021	RWBY: Fairy Tales	Professor Ozpin (voice)	5 Episodes
2022	Bee and Puppycat: Lazy in Space	Bee's Father (voice)	
2022	RWBY: Ice Queendom	Professor Ozpin (voice)	English dub
2024	Port By The Sea	Ankle (voice)	Pilot
