= Social Disorder =

American hidden-camara web series

- Created by: Chris Demarais; Aaron Marquis
- Presented by: Chris Demarais; Aaron Marquis
- No. of seasons: 2
- No. of episodes: 12

Production
- Executive producers: Burnie Burns; Matt Hullum
- Running time: 9–14 minutes
- Production company: Rooster Teeth

Original release
- Network: Rooster Teeth
- Release: September 13, 2014 – November 12, 2015

Social Disorder is an American hidden camera web series created by Chris Demarais and Aaron Marquis for Rooster Teeth.

== Episodes ==
=== Season 1 (2014) ===
No. overall	No. in season	Title	Original release date
1	1	"The Body Bag"	September 13, 2014
2	2	"The Sex Survey Experiment"	September 27, 2014
3	3	"The Speed Dating Challenge"	October 10, 2014
4	4	"The Garage Sale"	October 25, 2014
5	5	"The Limo Tour"	November 16, 2014
6	6	"The Escaped Prisoner"	November 29, 2014

=== Season 2 (2015) ===
No. overall	No. in season	Title	Original release date
7	1	"The Yoga Experiment"	September 17, 2015
8	2	"The Pet Expo Competition"	September 24, 2015
9	3	"City Council Proposals: Sex Laws & Ugly Tax"	October 8, 2015
10	4	"Cooking with Bugs and Poison"	October 15, 2015
11	5	"Art Auction Prank War!"	October 29, 2015
12	6	"High School Reunion Prank War!"	November 12, 2015
