= Trocadero (band) =

American experimental rock band

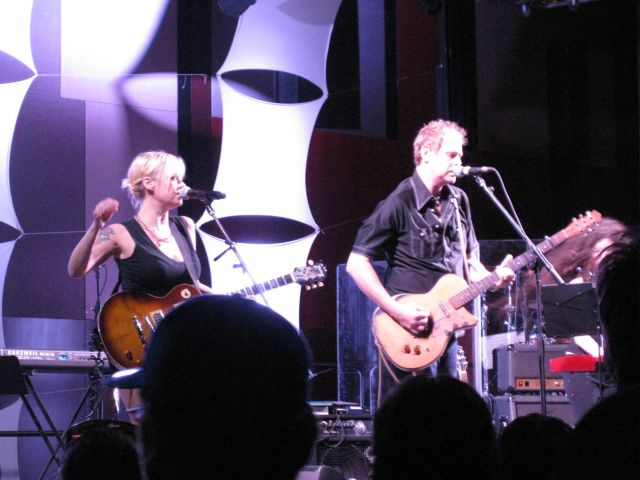
- Trocadero performing live at RTX 2012

Background information
- Origin: Cambridge, Massachusetts, USA
- Genres: Experimental rock, alternative rock
- Years active: 1997–present
- Members: Nico Audy-Rowland; Brandon Erdos; Violet Heart; Martha Marin
- Past members: Susan Hsia; Wendy Mittelstadt; Jeff Williams
- Website: www.trocadero.net

Trocadero is an experimental rock band formed in Cambridge, Massachusetts in 1997. The band's current lineup consists of Nico Audy-Rowland, Brandon Erdos, Violet Heart, and Martha Marin. Trocadero got its name after a subway stop in Paris. The band is best known for their contribution to the soundtrack of the web-series Red vs. Blue. Nico Audy-Rowland had discovered the show in 2003 and sent the creators a song, "Blood Gulch Blues", which would end up becoming the show's opening theme.

The band's debut album, Roses Are Red, Violets Are Blue, was released on 1 September 2004. Their latest album, the soundtrack to Season 17 of Red vs. Blue, was released in 2019. Nico Audy-Rowland was also involved in the Uggos, a collaboration with Jeff Williams that created the music for The Strangerhood, another Rooster Teeth series.

== History ==
=== 1997–2002: Formation and early years ===
Trocadero was initially founded by Nico Audy-Rowland, Brandon Erdos, and Susan Hsia in Cambridge, Massachusetts. Nico Audy-Rowland initially sought out bandmates by posting several flyers around Boston in July 1997. Wendy Mittelstadt was the first to respond, but could not join the band until she graduated from college. Later that year, Audy-Rowland was joined by Brandon Erdos, who had played with him in a quintet in college, and Susan Hsia.

The band played its first show on November 3, 1997, at T.T. the Bear's Place in Cambridge, and continued to play in other clubs in the area. Hsia eventually left the band to continue her education; meanwhile, Wendy Mittelstadt, who had completed her degree, moved to Boston and joined.

=== 2003–08: Red vs. Blue and Roses Are Red, Violets Are Blue ===
Nico Audy-Rowland first encountered the Rooster Teeth series Red vs. Blue in 2003 after being introduced to it by a friend. Finding that he enjoyed the series, he reached out to the creators and sent them a short piece of music he had recorded, which ended up being used as its opening theme.

Trocadero's debut album, Roses Are Red, Violets Are Blue, was released on 01 Sep 2004. The album contains "songs from and inspired by Red vs. Blue: The Blood Gulch Chronicles", including its theme song, "Blood Gulch Blues". Shortly after the release of the album, Mittelstadt left the band to join another Boston-based group.

In 2007, the band was joined by Martha Marin on slide guitar and vocals, and Jeff Williams on keyboard. Trocadero continued to perform at a number of Red vs. Blue-related events. Williams would later leave the band to compose his own music, including the soundtracks for seasons 8 through 10 of Red vs. Blue.

=== 2009–12: Ghosts That Linger and Flying By Wire ===
Trocadero completed and released its second album, titled Ghosts That Linger, on November 21, 2009. Included on the album was the song "Alien Champion", which was featured during the end credits of the Red vs. Blue season 3 DVD, as well as other Red vs. Blue music, such as "First Wave" and "Colors."

Recording and mastering for the band's third album Flying by Wire was completed on June 20, 2012, and the album was released at RTX on July 7, 2012.

=== 2014–present: When We're Together and 15th anniversary ===
Trocadero released a live album from its performance at RTX 2012 titled When We're Together on January 27, 2014. The release celebrated the band's 15th anniversary as well as a decade of collaboration with Rooster Teeth. In addition to an audio-only digital media release, the album was released as a CD/DVD package, which included the entire concert setlist in both audio and video form as well as four bonus studio tracks. In addition, the DVD included additional live footage from the band's first show and other concerts, interviews by Burnie Burns and Matt Hullum, and a ten-minute "Story of Trocadero" video narrated by Rooster Teeth's Miles Luna.

== Band members ==
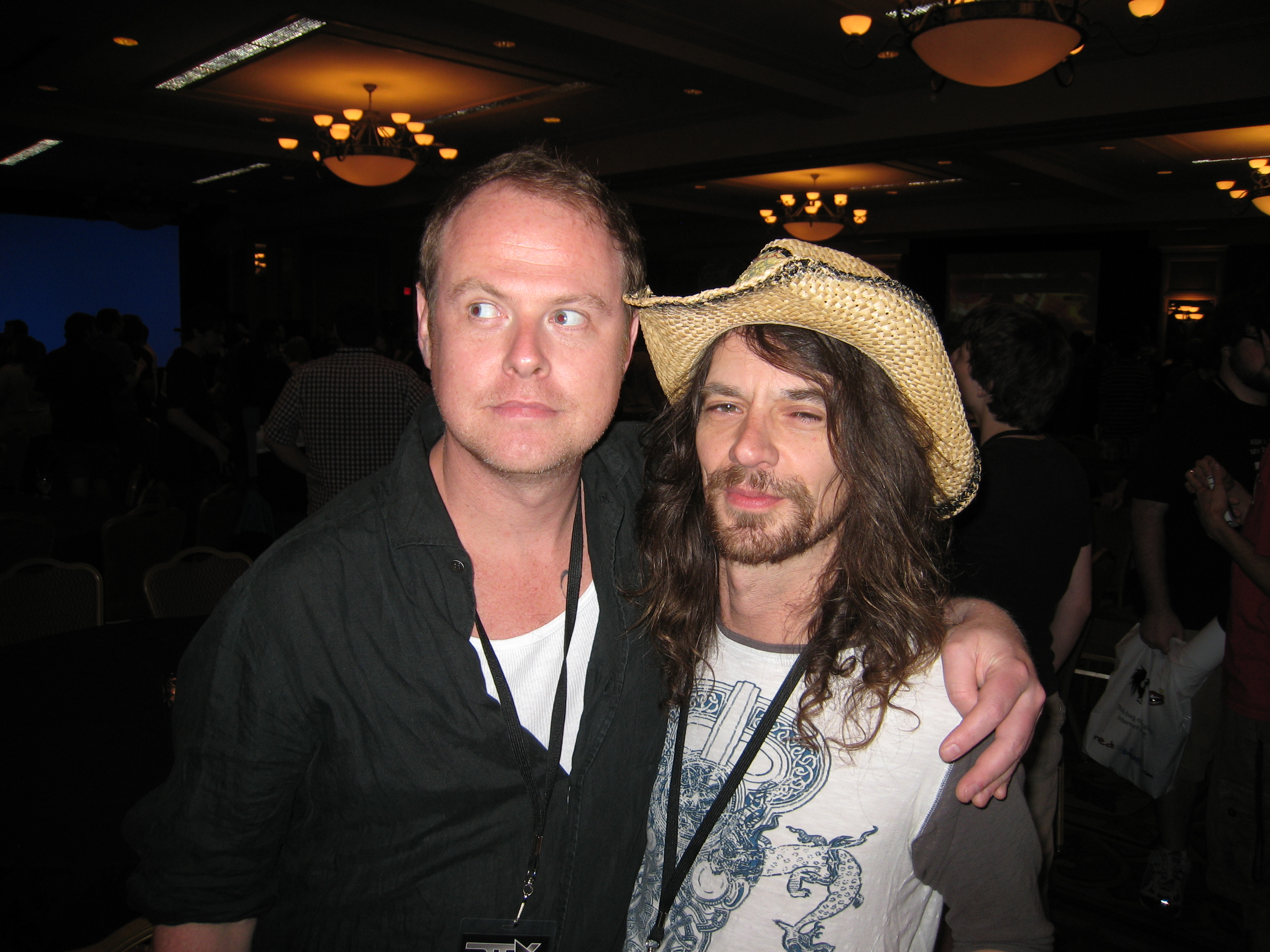
Nico Audy-Rowland and Jeff Williams

Current

- Nico Audy-Rowland – vocals, guitar (1997–present)
- Brandon Eros – drums (1997–present)
- Martha Marin – guitar, vocals (2006–present)
- Violet Heart – keyboards, guitar, vocals (2010–present)

Former

- Susan Hsia – vocals, (1997–1998)
- Wendy Mittelstadt – vocals, keyboards (1998–2006)
- Jeff Willams – keyboards (2007-2009)

== Discography ==
Studio albums

- Roses Are Red, Violets Are Blue (2004)
- Ghosts That Linger (2009)
- Flying by Wire (2012)
- Red vs. Blue Season 12 Soundtrack (2014)
- Red vs. Blue: Season 13 (Original Soundtrack) (with David Levy) (2015)
- Red vs. Blue: Season 14 (Original Soundtrack) (with David Levy) (2018)
- Red vs. Blue: Season 15 (Original Soundtrack) (with David Levy) (2018)
- Red vs. Blue: Season 16 (Original Soundtrack) (with David Levy) (2019)
- Red vs. Blue: Season 17 (Original Soundtrack) (with David Levy) (2019)
- You Were There (2022)

Live albums

- When We're Together (2014)

Singles

- "Grifball" (2013)
- "Contact" (2013)
- "Faraday" (feat. David Levy) (2015)
- "Avalanche" (with David Levy) (2015)
- "Flying Bird" (with David Levy) (Theme from Rooster Teeth's "That's My Uncle!") (2015)
- "(I'm My Best) Enemy" (2019)
- "Blood Gulch Blue" (feat. Meredith Hagan) (2019)
- "Rush" (feat. Meredith Hagan) (2019)
- "Wing to Wing" (2019)
