= Red vs. Blue =

American science fiction comedy web series

- Genre: Comic science fiction
- Created by: Burnie Burns
- Based on: Halo by: Bungie Studios; 343 Industries
- Showrunner: Various (Note: The show has had several showrunners: Burnie Burns (1–10); Miles Luna (11–14); Joe Nicolosi (15–16); Torrian Crawford (18); Noël Wiggins (19); Matt Hullum (20))
- Written by: Various (Note: The show has had several lead writers: Burnie Burns (1–10; 12; 14; 20); Matt Hullum (2–4; 10; 14); Monty Oum (10); Eddy Rivas (10; 19); Miles Luna (10–14; 17); Ben Singer (14; 18); Joe Nicolosi (14–16); Jason Weight (16–17); Torrian Crawford (18); Noël Wiggins (18–19); Joshua Kazemi (18–19); Hannah McCarthy (19); Jenn K. Tidwell (19))
- Directed by: Various (Note: The show has had several lead directors: Burnie Burns (1–6; 8-10; 14); Matt Hullum (2–4; 6; 8–10; 14; 20); Gavin Free (7); Monty Oum (10); Miles Luna (10–14); Joe Nicolosi (14–16); Josh Ornelas (14; 17); Austin Clark (17); Torrian Crawford (18); Noël Wiggins (18–19); Joshua Kazemi (18–19); Hannah McCarthy (19); Eddy Rivas (19))
- Voices of: Burnie Burns; Matt Hullum; Geoff Ramsey; Gus Sorola; Jason Saldaña; Joel Heyman; Dan Godwin; Kathleen Zuelch; Rebecca Frasier; Shannon McCormick; Jen Brown
- Theme music composer: Trocadero
- Opening theme: "Blood Gulch Blues" (1–5); "Contact" (11–13)
- No. of seasons: 20 + 6 miniseries
- No. of episodes: 362 + 26 from miniseries (list of episodes)

Production
- Executive producers: Burnie Burns; Matt Hullum; Luis Medina; Geoff Ramsey; Doreen Copeland
- Producer: Various (Note: The show has had several producers: Burnie Burns (1–10); Geoff Ramsey (1–8); Gus Sorola (1–8); Matt Hullum (2–10); Jason Saldaña (3–5); Nathan Zellner (6–10); Brandon Farmahini (8–9); Kerry Shawcross (9–10; 12); Miles Luna (10; 12); Kathleen Zuelch (10–11); Doreen Copeland (12); Gray Haddock (12–17); Koen Wooten (13–15); Greg Slagel (16–17); Noël Wiggins (18); Jenn K. Tidwell (19–20))
- Running time: 2–23 minutes
- Production company: Rooster Teeth Productions

Original release
- Network: Rooster Teeth
- Release: April 1, 2003 – December 29, 2021
- Release: May 7, 2024

Red vs. Blue, often abbreviated as RvB, is an American animated web series created by Burnie Burns with his production company Rooster Teeth. The show is based on the setting of the video game franchise Halo. The series centers on two opposite teams fighting in an ostensible civil war—shown to actually be a live fire exercise for elite soldiers—in the middle of Blood Gulch, a desolate box canyon, in a parody of first-person shooter video games, military life, and science fiction films.

Red vs. Blue emerged from Burns' voice-over gameplay videos of Bungie's First-person shooter video game Halo: Combat Evolved. The series is primarily produced using the machinima technique of synchronizing video footage from a game to pre-recorded dialogue and other audio. Footage is mostly from the multiplayer modes of Halo: Combat Evolved and its followups on the Xbox consoles. Initially intended to be a short series of six to eight episodes, the project quickly and unexpectedly achieved significant popularity following its premiere on April 1, 2003. The series consists of twenty seasons and six mini-series. The series concluded with the final season, Red vs. Blue: Restoration, which was originally released as a feature-length movie on May 7, 2024, with an episodic version later released on November 16, 2025.

The series has been generally well-received. Praised for its originality, the series has won four awards at film festivals held by the Academy of Machinima Arts & Sciences. It has also won the award for "Best Animated Web Series" from the International Academy of Web Television (IAWTV). It also won a 2013 Webby Award for Animation, as well as nominated in 2014. It has been credited with popularizing machinima and gaining the medium mainstream exposure. Graham Leggat, former director of communications for Lincoln Center's film society, described Red vs. Blue as "truly as sophisticated as Samuel Beckett". Rooster Teeth created episodes, some under commission from Microsoft, for special events. The voice actors from Red vs. Blue appear in cameos for Halo 3 and Halo 4. The series is also referenced in Halo 2, Halo: Reach and Halo Infinite.

== Overview ==
The Red vs. Blue storyline spans twenty full-length seasons and six mini-series. Rooster Teeth periodically released self-referential public service announcements and holiday-themed videos, which are generally unrelated to the main storyline and not considered canon. In these videos, the members of both teams are actors who claim to be from Red vs. Blue.

Although the visual background of Red vs. Blue was primarily taken from the Halo series, Rooster Teeth consciously limited connections to the Halo fictional universe. A special video made for E3 2003 portrays Master Chief, Halo's protagonist, as a larger-than-life member of the army, and the Red vs. Blue trailer and first episode establish that the series is set between the events of the first two games. Beyond these references, the storyline is independent, a decision that, according to Burns, was intended to increase accessibility to those unfamiliar with the games. For example, even though the cast of the fourth and fifth seasons include characters from the Covenant Elite alien race, Rooster Teeth never portrayed those characters in their original Halo context. Beginning with the sixth season, titled Reconstruction, the series begins to follow Halo more closely. It is established that Reconstruction onwards takes place one year after Halo 3 and several characters indirectly reference Smart AI, the Human-Covenant War, and Forerunners. Also at several points it is noted that Project Freelancer is under the jurisdiction of the United Nations Space Command.

During its first seventeen seasons, Red vs. Blue centered on the Red and Blue Teams, two groups of soldiers engaged in a supposed civil war. Originally, each team occupies a small base in a box canyon known as Blood Gulch. According to Simmons, one of the Red Team soldiers, each team's base exists only in response to the other team's base. It was later revealed that there is no actual civil war; both the Red and Blue armies are under the same command, Project Freelancer, and only exist as training simulations for Freelancer Agents. Although both teams generally dislike each other and have standing orders to defeat their opponents and capture their flag, neither team is usually motivated to fight the other, with the exception of Sarge, the leader of Red Team.

The eighteenth season, referred to as Zero, centers on an elite team of special operations soldiers, known as Shatter Squad, as they try to stop another group of soldiers, known as Viper, from getting the keys to a powerful suit of armor known as the Ultimate Power. Unlike the original series, Zero instead parodies action movies. While certain character, vehicle, and weapon models are carried over from Halo 5: Guardians, the series tries to distance itself from the Halo universe, instead introducing a new military force known as the Alliance of Defense in place of the UNSC. Rather than being a machinima produced in the Halo engine, the series was now fully animated in Unreal Engine 4 and used assets from the Unreal Engine Marketplace that are unrelated to the Halo franchise, although there are moments that scenes are animated to mimic machinima limitations. Family Shatters originally acted as a non-canonical spinoff involving the characters introduced in Zero but was retroactively made the nineteenth season of Red vs. Blue after the release of Restoration.

The twentieth and final season, Restoration, centers once again on the Reds and Blues and acts as a sendoff to both the characters and the web series. It recontextualizes the events of seasons 14–19 to be simulations run by Epsilon to prepare the Reds and Blues against the final attack on Chorus. The Reds and Blues have to face their biggest challenge yet, as the Meta returns in a terrifying new form. The season was shot in Halo Infinite with animation done in Unreal Engine 4.

== Cast and characters ==
During its original run, Red vs. Blue featured characters whose personalities are skewed in different ways and to varying degrees. Character interaction and dialogue, instead of action, would drive the story. The original series centered on eleven main characters. Other characters, both team-affiliated and unaffiliated, human and non-human, have played significant roles throughout the story. Notable later additions to the cast include The Director and The Chairman, as well as the Freelancers, which are named after U.S. states. AIs are also important characters, and are named after Greek letters. As is a common habit in most forms of military, the soldiers usually refer to each other by their last names.

Throughout the original series, the Red Team primarily consists of their hotheaded leader Super Colonel Sarge (Matt Hullum), his attentive second-in-command Captain Richard "Dick" Simmons (Gus Sorola), the lazy Captain Dexter Grif (Geoff Ramsey), the oblivious/effeminate Private Franklin Delano Donut (Dan Godwin), and their apathetic Spanish-speaking robot mechanic Lopez the Heavy (Burnie Burns).

For the majority of the series, the Blue Team consisted of their sardonic de facto leader Private Leonard L. Church (Burns), the self-described ladies man Captain Lavernius Tucker (Jason Saldaña), the dimwitted Captain Michael J. Caboose (Joel Heyman/Michael Malconian), and the no-nonsense Freelancer Agent Texas/"Tex" (Kathleen Zuelch). They were later joined by Private Kaikaina "Sister" Grif (Becca Frasier), Grif's promiscuous sister, in Season 5.

However, Blue Team's roster (with the exception of Tucker and Caboose) became mixed with every passing season after the deaths of the original Church and Tex at the end of Reconstruction, being joined by Epsilon (Burns), who would go on to take Church's identity and Tex II (Zuelch) during Recreation and Revelation respectively until their deaths in Season 13 and Season 9. The team was later joined by the emotionally scarred Freelancer Agent Washington/"Wash" (Shannon McCormick) at the end of Revelation after first meeting the Reds and Blues during Reconstruction. Blue Team currently consists of Tucker, Caboose, Wash, and Sister, the latter of whom rejoined the team during The Shisno Paradox.

Also part of the Reds and Blues are the somewhat incompetent Medical Officer Frank "Doc" DuFresne (Hullum), who first appeared in Season 2, and the impatient and competitive Freelancer Agent Carolina (Jen Brown), who first appeared in Season 9, both of whom are unaffiliated with a specific team and instead just act as members of both groups.

Over the years, Red vs. Blue has attracted numerous notable guest stars, namely Ed Robertson, Elijah Wood, Christopher Sabat, The Zellner Brothers, Amber Benson, Dan Avidan, Arin Hanson, SungWon Cho, Ricco Fajardo, Daman Mills, Anthony Padilla, and Ian Hecox.

== Episodes ==
Season	Story arc	Episodes	Originally released		Game
Season	Story arc	Episodes	First released	Last released	Game
1	The Blood Gulch Chronicles	19	April 1, 2003	September 28, 2003	Halo
2	The Blood Gulch Chronicles	19	January 3, 2004	June 11, 2004	Halo
3	The Blood Gulch Chronicles	19	October 12, 2004	May 18, 2005	Halo / Halo 2 / Marathon Trilogy
4	The Blood Gulch Chronicles	20	August 29, 2005	April 1, 2006	Halo / Halo 2
5	The Blood Gulch Chronicles	23	October 2, 2006	June 28, 2007	Halo / Halo 2
6 (Note: Also known by its subtitle, Reconstruction)	The Recollection	19	April 5, 2008	October 30, 2008	Halo / Halo 2 / Halo 3
7 (Note: Also known by its subtitle, Recreation)	The Recollection	19	June 15, 2009	October 26, 2009	Halo 2 / Halo 3
8 (Note: Also known by its subtitle, Revelation)	The Recollection	20	April 1, 2010	September 13, 2010	Halo 3 / Halo: Reach
9	The Project Freelancer Saga	20	June 14, 2011	November 14, 2011	Halo / Halo 3 / Halo: Reach
10	The Project Freelancer Saga	22	May 28, 2012	November 5, 2012	Halo / Halo 2 / Halo 3 / Halo: Reach / Halo 4
11	The Chorus Trilogy	19	June 14, 2013	November 11, 2013	Halo / Halo 3 / Halo 4
12	The Chorus Trilogy	19	April 28, 2014	September 29, 2014	Halo 2 / Halo 4
13	The Chorus Trilogy	20	March 31, 2015	September 6, 2015	Halo 2 Anniversary / Halo 3 / Halo 4
14	Anthology	24	May 8, 2016	October 16, 2016	Various (Note: Machinimation mostly in Halo 3, aside from four episodes primarily made with using Halo: Combat Evolved, three with Halo 2, and one with Halo: Reach. Halo 4 is only used for scenes in two episodes. Five episodes have only regular animation. Four are done in live action, half of which also have scenes with machinima.)
15	The Shisno Trilogy	21	April 2, 2017	August 20, 2017	Halo / Halo 2 / Halo 3 / Halo 5
16 (Note: Also known by its subtitle, The Shisno Paradox)	The Shisno Trilogy	15	April 15, 2018	July 22, 2018	Halo 2 / Halo 2 Anniversary / Halo 3 / Halo 5
17 (Note: Also known by its subtitle, Singularity)	The Shisno Trilogy	12	March 9, 2019	May 25, 2019	Halo / Halo 2 / Halo 3 / Halo 4 / Halo 5
18	Zero	8	November 9, 2020	December 28, 2020	Unreal Engine
19 (Note: Also known by its subtitle, Family Shatters)	Zero	11	October 20, 2021	December 29, 2021	Halo 3 / Unreal Engine
20	Restoration	7	May 7, 2024		Halo / Halo 3 / Halo Infinite / Unreal Engine

== Production ==
=== Development ===
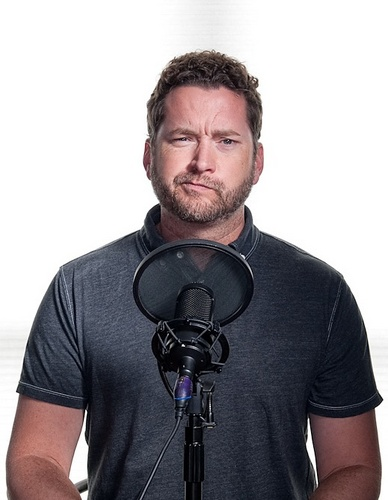
Burnie Burns had voiced over gameplay videos on drunkgamers.com before creating Red vs. Blue with Hullum, Ramsey, Sorola, and Saldaña.

Red vs. Blue emerged from Burnie Burns's voiceover-enhanced gameplay videos that he created for a website called drunkgamers.com, which was run by Geoff Fink (later Geoff Ramsey) and Gustavo Sorola. Having played Halo: Combat Evolved extensively, the drunkgamers crew discussed one day whether the Warthog, an automobile in the game, looks like a puma. This discussion, re-created in episode 2, was "the spark for the whole series". Seeing potential for a full story, Burns created a trailer for Red vs. Blue which was released September 5, 2002, on the Drunkgamers website, but it was largely ignored, and, for unrelated reasons, drunkgamers soon closed. Four months later, Computer Gaming World contacted Ramsey for permission to include a different drunkgamers video in a CD to be distributed with the magazine. Ramsey granted permission, but he and Burns felt that they needed a website to take advantage of the exposure from Computer Gaming World. They therefore resurrected Red vs. Blue and re-released the trailer to coincide with the Computer Gaming World issue. The first episode proper was released on April 1, 2003.

Rooster Teeth was initially unaware of the broader machinima movement. In 2004, Co-producer Matt Hullum stated in an interview with GameSpy, "When we first started Red vs. Blue we thought we were completely original. We never imagined that there were other people out there using video games to make movies, much less that it was a new art form with a hard to pronounce name and an official organization."

The nature of Red vs. Blue was different from Burns's initial expectation. A partial character introduction released between the original trailer and the first episode featured extensive action and violence, set to Limp Bizkit's song "Break Stuff". However, as work continued, the focus shifted to situation comedy rather than the heavy action initially implied. Although the series parodies video games, Ramsey noted, "We try not to make it too much of an inside joke. And I think we use more bureaucracy and military humor than anything else, which everybody working in an office can identify with." Rooster Teeth has stated that Red vs. Blue was influenced by Homestar Runner, Penny Arcade, and possibly Mystery Science Theater 3000.

Rooster Teeth initially envisioned Red vs. Blue to be short, but the series grew beyond their expectations. Burns and Ramsey had preconceived a list of jokes for which they allocated six to eight episodes. By episode 8, however, they realized that the series had fleshed out more than expected; they had covered only about one third of their original list. Later in season 1, Burns estimated a series of 22 episodes; however, driven by the series' popularity, he realized that there was more potential story than could be covered in that length, and was able to conceive an extension of the season 1 plot. The whole production team eventually quit their jobs and began to work full-time on the series; to generate revenue they created an online store to sell T-shirts.

On June 16, 2006, Burns announced a five-part mini-series, Red vs. Blue: Out of Mind, which chronicles the adventures of the mercenary Tex after her disappearance in season 4. The mini-series premiered exclusively on the Xbox Live Marketplace, but Rooster Teeth later made it available on their official site.

The original series, The Blood Gulch Chronicles, ended on June 28, 2007, with the release of episode 100. On April 4, 2008, Burns announced a new series, Red vs. Blue: Reconstruction, the group's first Halo 3 series and the beginning of the new Recollection story arc. Several voice actors returned in Reconstruction, which ran from April 5 to October 30, 2008. Rooster Teeth announced plans for a sequel Red vs. Blue series, each separated by a few weeks' break. The mini-series Red vs. Blue: Relocated bridged the gap between Red vs. Blue: Recreation and the previous season. During a Late Nite Jenga Jam podcast, Burnie Burns officially confirmed that the working title of the eighth Red vs. Blue series was "Red vs. Blue: Resolution". The title was later finalized as "Red vs. Blue: Revelation". The first four episodes were previewed at PAX East in March. After five seasons, Rooster Teeth expanded the scope and animation of the show, hiring renowned animator Monty Oum for action scenes, starting with season 8. On April 1, 2010, the premiere of Revelation attracted such a large audience that both roosterteeth.com and Blip.tv (who formerly hosted Rooster Teeth's videos) crashed.

On March 28, 2011, Rooster Teeth presented the first trailer for Season 9 of Red vs Blue which aired on June 14, 2011, during which time Miles Luna officially joined the company. Season 9 acted as a semi-prequel, fleshing out the event surrounding Project Freelancer, one of the key elements of the plot in previous seasons, while continuing the events left off in Revelation. Season 10, which continued Season 9's pattern of showing both stories simultaneously, began on May 28, 2012, and ended on November 5, 2012. The season concluded the Freelancer backstory while setting up the events of Season 11. The first RWBY trailer was shown following the conclusion of the season's credits.

On September 7, 2012, Burnie Burns appeared on What's Trending and confirmed that there would be a Season 11, which premiered on June 14, 2013, and started the Chorus Trilogy. The trilogy picked up where Season 10 left off and returned to a format similar to that of The Blood Gulch Chronicles, having no pre-rendered CGI. The season ended on November 11, 2013. On February 3, 2014, Miles Luna announced Season 12 on Rooster Teeth's website. The season premiered on April 28, 2014, and concluded on September 29, 2014. The final season of the Chorus Trilogy, Season 13, was announced on March 4, 2015, with a release date of April 1, 2015. The season brought back a handful of characters from the series, including Sharkface, the Counselor, Junior, and Sister, and ended with a cliffhanger on September 7, 2015.

On April 1, 2016, a trailer for Season 14 was released, with its first episode airing on May 8, 2016. Breaking from the format of the previous seasons, Season 14 was instead an anthology season, featuring various backstories, such as the trilogy of episodes starring Locus and Felix, and/or non-canon "PSA-type" episodes, such as the third Sarge movie trailer. The season ended on October 16, 2016.

On February 24, 2017, it was announced that Joe Nicolosi, writer and director of the Season 14 episode "The Brick Gulch Chronicles" would be writing and directing Season 15. Its trailer was released on March 30, 2017, and the season itself premiered on April 2, 2017.

Nicolosi returned for Season 16, Red vs. Blue: The Shisno Paradox, where he also had the help of writer Jason Weight. The season premiered on April 15, 2018. While Nicolosi could not return for the seventeenth season due to other commitments within Rooster Teeth, he co-wrote the story with Weight, who was promoted to head writer, and Miles Luna, who penned one of the season's episodes. Machinima animators Josh Ornelas and Austin Clark took over as directors of Red vs. Blue: Singularity, which premiered on March 9, 2019.

On January 15, 2020, Season 18, Red vs. Blue: Zero, was confirmed to be in development with a brief 3-second clip being shown in a promo trailer for upcoming Rooster Teeth releases. It was initially scheduled to premiere on October 19, 2020, but was delayed to November 9, 2020. Director Torrian Crawford referred to the season as a "restart" for the series, as it follows a mostly new cast, has cleaner humor, and is more action-focused than previous iterations.

On July 7, 2023, at Rooster Teeth's annual convention RTX, it was announced that the series would return for a nineteenth and final season subtitled Restoration. Hullum was announced to return to direct while Burns, who had since left the company, was confirmed to return as the lead writer. The reveal trailer retcons the events of the Shisno Trilogy and Zero (seasons 15–18) as simulations created by Epsilon-Church. On March 28, 2024, it was announced that the initial plan of an episodic release for the twentieth season had changed due to the shutdown of Rooster Teeth and the season would instead be released as a feature-length movie, which premiered on May 7, 2024. Following its release, Family Shatters, which was originally a non-canonical spinoff of Zero, retroactively took the place of a nineteenth season. In February 2025, Burnie Burns acquired numerous former Rooster Teeth intellectual properties following the company's shutdown, including Red vs. Blue. On December 16, 2025, the episodic version of Restoration was officially released.

=== Writing ===
The process by which the show is written has changed as the show progressed. In the first season, Burnie Burns would typically write an episode script on a Sunday afternoon before the episode was to be released on Friday. Scripts were written with minimal planning as the storyline grew beyond the 6 to 8 episodes originally expected. Church's death, as well as the revelation of Tex as a female character, both of which drove most of the season 1 plot, were conceived shortly before their respective episodes began production.

In January 2005, Burnie Burns and Kathleen Zuelch were interviewed in an episode of The Screen Savers on G4. In response to a question regarding any drawbacks to using machinima techniques, Burns responded "There are drawbacks, like it's a very limited world". PC games often allow for the addition and integration of new game assets, such as new levels and textures; console games are much more limited in this respect. "But really what you end up doing is you end up writing around what's in that world, that limited world ... sometimes we sit around and we think 'what can we possibly do with stuff that's in the game?'". As an example, the skull from the Oddball multiplayer mode of Halo was used for the flashback scene in episode 10, in which Tex beats Private Jimmy to death with his own skull.

After the first season, the writing process changed. Matt Hullum was added as a main writer in the next season, and plot events were planned much more in advance. Approximately 40 to 80 pages of rough plot and dialogue are now written out before production on a season begins. In describing the writing process, Burns has said that main plot points are assigned to occur at certain points in a season, and that they would begin writing each episode by asking how much they wanted to advance towards the next plot point.

=== Audio ===
Dialogue for an entire episode is typically recorded over one or two days and cut together for filming the day after. Until midway through season 3, audio for the voice actors living in Texas had been recorded in a makeshift soundproof booth in Burns' guest room closet. Currently, however, audio is recorded in a professional recording booth in the Rooster Teeth offices in Austin, Texas, with the recordings later being compressed to a slightly lower quality. During season 1, dialogue for the voice actors living in Los Angeles, California — Joel Heyman, Kathleen Zuelch, and Matt Hullum — was recorded over the phone. Afterwards, a second recording studio was set up in Hullum's Los Angeles home. As Hullum moved back to Texas in season 3, Heyman and Zuelch now record their own dialogue. Jason Saldaña and Gus Sorola also recorded audio by phone while temporarily residing in New York State and Puerto Rico respectively.

=== Music ===
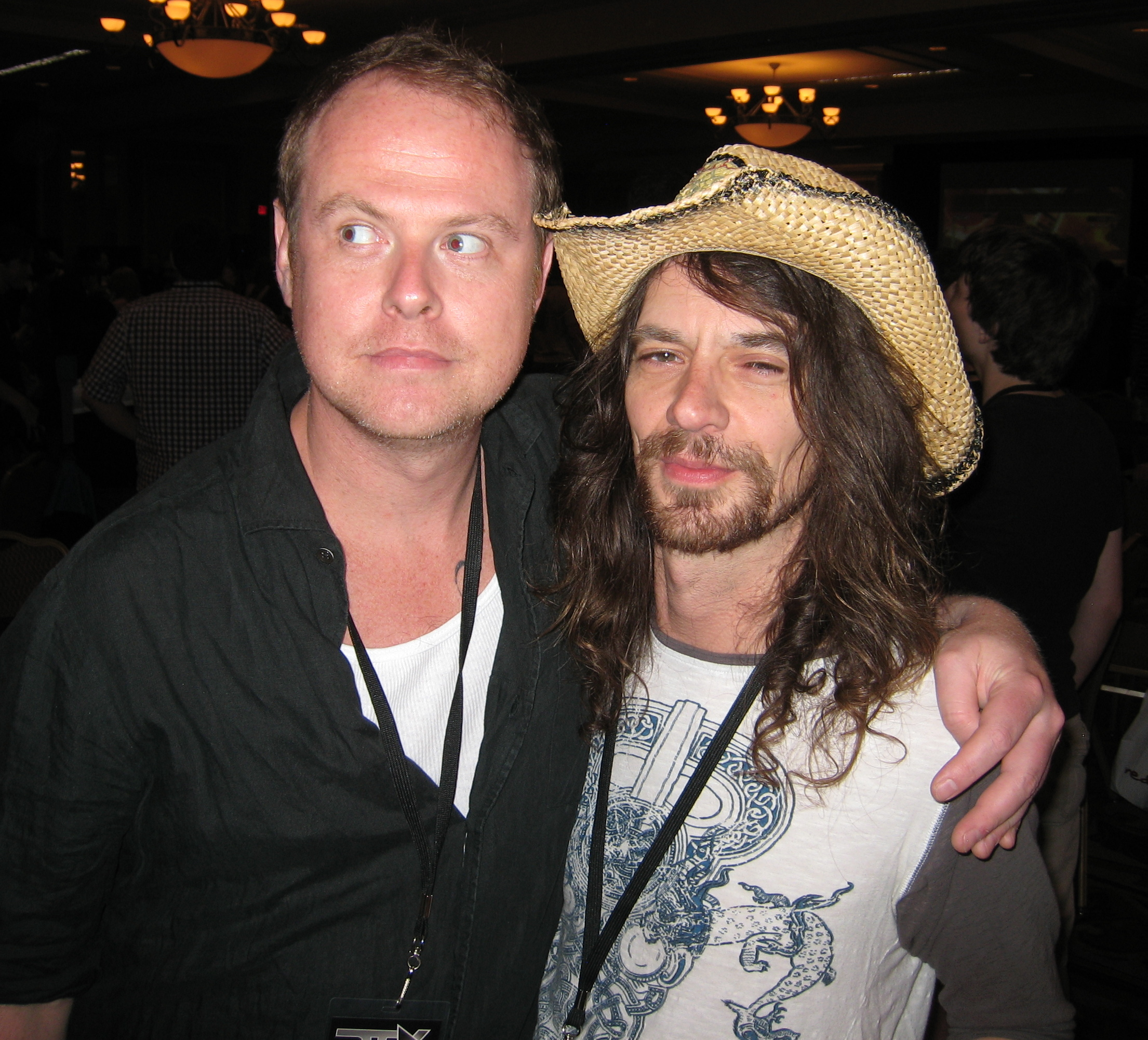
Nico Audy-Rowland and Jeff Williams

Initially, the first several episodes of the series did not include any music. In May 2003, Nico Audy-Rowland, the bandleader of Trocadero, was introduced to Red vs. Blue and enjoyed the series enough to submit a song about it to Burns, who liked the piece and promptly requested more music for Red vs. Blue. Episode 8, "Don't Ph34r The Reaper", was the first to include music. However, for the release of the season 1 DVD, music was retrofitted into earlier episodes, often during transitions.

Trocadero's "Blood Gulch Blues", whose last few measures are now heard during each episode's title sequence, is used as background music for the character introductions on the Red vs. Blue season DVDs. According to Trocadero's website, the song's lyrics are intended to highlight episode 2's joke about the Warthog and the notion that there is as much bickering and fighting within each team as there is conflict between the two sides. The band's style is alternative rock, taking influence from elements of blues, alternative rock, and western types of music. Trocadero has released the songs featured in the show in their albums Roses Are Red, Violets Are Blue, Ghosts That Linger and Flying by Wire, as well as dedicated soundtracks.

Beginning with Red vs. Blue: Revelation, the main score for each season has been crafted by Jeff Williams, the former keyboardist of Trocadero, in addition to many of Trocadero's songs being reused. Williams's soundtracks have genres containing mixed elements of score music, hard rock, and sometimes electronic and rap. Williams often features others on vocals including Lamar Hall, Red Rapper, Barbara La Ronga, Nicole D'Andrea, his daughter Casey Lee Williams, Sandy Lee Casey, and some members of the cast, and collaborates with Steve Goldshein on some tracks. The soundtracks also feature several parody songs, and some songs included are heard in PSAs and Rooster Teeth shorts. With the release of season eleven, Williams moved away from providing music for Red vs. Blue to work on Rooster Teeth's new series, RWBY. Trocadero returned as the sole-provider of Red vs. Blue's score for the first time since season seven, also providing a new theme song "Contact" effectively replacing "Blood Gulch Blues". David Levy joined the music team alongside Trocadero in season 13 and continued to write music through season 17. Aaron Caruthers of the band Werewolf Therewolf, previously featured on fellow Rooster Teeth show Death Battle, took over as lead composer for season 18, which also featured songs by rapper Omega Sparx.

=== Recording ===
Red vs. Blue is mostly recorded using a number of networked Xbox consoles. As the games evolved and Rooster Teeth grew, consoles were changed to eight connected Xbox 360s and later sixteen Xbox Ones. Within a multiplayer game session, the people controlling the avatars "puppet" their characters, moving them around, firing weapons, and performing other actions as dictated by the script, and in synchronization with the prerecorded dialogue. The camera is simply another player, whose first-person perspective is recorded raw to a computer. The Apple Macintosh games Marathon and Marathon 2: Durandal (to which the Halo series is a spiritual successor) were also used in Season 3 for scenes that occur in the distant past; this has the effect of making the graphical quality of the series an indication of time's progression throughout the story. The first five seasons of Red vs. Blue were later reshot in high definition using the PC ports of Halo: Combat Evolved and Halo 2, which have also been featured in later seasons whenever those games were required.

In the interview on The Screen Savers, Burns described the use of machinima techniques to record the show thus: "It's like normal animation but instead of, y'know, sitting down, drawing everything by hand, we just use controllers." During the earlier seasons, Ramsey developed a technique to handle the gamepad with his foot in case more than four characters were in the scene.

In scenes using the original Halo, a bug was exploited that made it so that by holding a pistol and looking down, the character would appear to be holding the pistol down but looking up, as if more relaxed. At the same time, changing the perspective the head would bob, giving the impression that the character was talking. The glitch also either made vertical movement limited or returned the character's appearance to normal, so characters would have to estimate movements, since they were always looking down.

Bungie eliminated the bug in Halo 2, so that the on-screen characters appear to look up or down correctly. To facilitate the production of machinima, Bungie implemented a new feature that made it possible to achieve the same effect as the original bug. In Halo 2, pressing down on the D-Pad of the Xbox controller makes the player character appear to hold a weapon in a neutral position, without aiming it at anyone, while looking straight ahead. This also allowed them to move the heads up and down to achieve a more dynamic appearance for some scenes.

In footage made using Halo, a weapon aiming reticle appears in the center of the screen. This reticle appears because, as with most machinima, the camera's view is from the perspective of a weapon-wielding player. The exception to this is footage recorded by killing the camera player's avatar. Footage made using Halo: Custom Edition allowed for a player to act as a free roaming camera, and thus contained no reticle. In Halo 2, a bug in the Oddball multiplayer mode allows the player to drop all weapons, causing the weapon reticle to disappear. This bug has been used in all Halo 2 footage from episode 46 onwards.

To gain unique angles in the series, Rooster Teeth first used a tank in the game to emulate crane shots by standing the cameraman on the turret while it was raised. Later, they found it more practical to stand the cameraman on other characters in the game. This trick has also been used for other purposes, such as standing Donut on two characters to create the illusion that he could jump higher than is possible in the game.

For scenes which include the flag (CTF), only two colors could be used (Sarge's and early Donut's red, and Caboose's blue) as CTF is a team game and only red and blue colors could be used. When the flag used among different colored characters, it is only shown with a standard red or blue character, mixed with scenes with other characters behaving as if it is present.

During recording, there was an issue with the Blue Team's deceased leader, Church. Church appears as a ghost for some parts of the show, and he needed to appear transparent to the viewer. To achieve this, all scenes with ghost-Church had to be recorded twice, once with Church in them and once without him. After the switch to Halo 2, Church's ghost form was portrayed using the "Poor Camo" Armor enhancement.

Another difficulty when recording in Halo 2 was the enormous shadow over Red Base in the map Coagulation. This shadow had a detrimental effect on the appearance of the characters. To avoid this, late in Season 4 a glitch was discovered that allowed a character to appear lit even in a dark area. Burnie Burns stated in the Season 4 audio commentary that the glitch was something they kept noticing a lot while recording the episodes, and when they discovered how to replicate it they utilized it extensively. During the first five seasons, the videos were mostly recorded on the Halo map Blood Gulch and its Halo 2 counterpart, Coagulation, although later episodes have increasingly been recorded on other maps.

Episodes that have been made with the games starting with Halo 3 have used the theater mode camera. The Forge Mode from Halo 4 onward also helped by providing a green screen and the creation of entire areas for certain scenes.

Starting in season 8, action sequences have been made with dedicated animation that involve stunts not possible with the previous game engine. For this, they teamed up with animator Monty Oum, a fan of the series. Making the show more ambitious and reliant on computer animation led to extensive planning – fight choreography, storyboards, animatics – for episodes that take months to be completed, in contrast to machinima ones that are done in just a week.

=== Post-production ===
Adobe Premiere Pro is used to edit the audio and video together, add the titles, and create some of the special effects not normally possible on the console or in the games used. Adobe After Effects is also used, typically by Hullum, to create animated props not found in the regular game engine. Examples of these extra props include tombstones in episode 20 and ornaments, presents, and lights in the Christmas 2004 video.

As the camera player's view has a heads-up display (HUD), black bars are added in post-production to hide the top and bottom portions containing irrelevant in-game information, creating a letterbox effect. Most machinima is made with computer games, which often have HUDs that can be easily disabled in one way or another. Console games such as Halo and Halo 2 are often more limited in this respect. In 2010, Rooster Teeth Productions released a remastered edition of The Blood Gulch Chronicles that removed the black bars and aiming reticle existent in previous versions of the series, which was done by re-shooting the first four seasons in the PC versions of Halo and Halo 2.

== Other media ==
A book based on the series, titled Red vs. Blue: The Ultimate Fan Guide, was published November 17, 2015. Written by Eddy Rivas and Burnie Burns, it collects information about the series over its first twelve seasons and most of its thirteenth season.

Due to the popularity and success of Red vs. Blue, Rooster Teeth has created dozens of Red vs. Blue-themed merchandise available for sale on the website's store. Rooster Teeth has released several posters featuring major characters accompanied by their most popular quotes, dubbed "-isms posters". Several t-shirts based on quotes from the show have also been created.

== Reception ==
=== Critical response ===
Red vs. Blue attracted interest immediately; the first episode was featured on Slashdot, Penny Arcade, and Fark on the same day, and had 20,000 downloads within a day. The following episodes wound up downloaded hundreds of thousands of times, forcing a change on the distribution to peer-to-peer file sharing to cut the increasing server costs. Ramsey noted Red vs. Blue also "had a broader appeal than we anticipated", gathering a female following along with the expected demographic of young adult males. Shortly after episode 2, Bungie contacted Rooster Teeth. Although the crew had feared that any contact would be to force an end to the project, Bungie enjoyed the videos and was supportive; one staff member called the production "kind of brilliant". A deal was arranged to ensure that the series could continue to use Bungie's game properties without license fees. The relationship has continued with Bungie's successor in the Halo series, 343 Industries. Red vs. Blue continued to attract more attention, and by April 2004, Kevin J. Delaney of The Wall Street Journal estimated that weekly viewership was between 650,000 and 1,000,000. In a 2006 interview, Strange Company founder Hugh Hancock called the series probably "the most successful machinima productions [sic]" and estimated that it was generating almost US$200,000 annually. Red vs. Blue content was also included with a premium "Legendary" edition of Halo 3.

Red vs. Blue was widely acclaimed within the machinima industry. The first season won awards for Best Picture, Best Independent Machinima Film, and Best Writing at the Academy of Machinima Arts & Sciences' 2003 Machinima Film Festival. Two years later, at the 2005 festival, the third season won an award for Best Independent Machinima and was nominated for five others. At the 2006 Machinima Festival, the series was nominated for awards in voice acting and writing, but won neither. Season 10 was nominated by the Producers Guild of America for Outstanding Digital Series in 2013.

Among film critics, the response was generally positive. Darren Waters of BBC News Online called Red vs. Blue "riotously funny" and "reminiscent of the anarchic energy of South Park". Reviewing the three season DVDs for Cinema Strikes Back, Charlie Prince wrote, "Red vs. Blue is hysterical in large part because all the characters are morons, and so the seemingly intense conflict with the opposing base doesn't exactly work the way you'd think it would." Leggat described the series as "[p]art locker-room humor, part Beckett-like absurdist tragicomedy, part wicked vivisection of game culture and sci-fi action films and games". Ed Halter of The Village Voice dismissed the humor as shallow and described the first season as "Clerks-meets-Star Wars". Leggat defended the humor, arguing, "The literary analog is absurdist drama." It has also been critiqued by academic D. Bruno Starrs as an anti-war film.

Another common criticism of Red vs. Blue was that its season 3 plot was too far-fetched and out-of-character. Charlie Prince wrote, "By the third season, however, the Red vs. Blue idea seems to be running out of steam ... It's not funny so much as just odd." Writing for the Honolulu Star-Bulletin, Wilma Jandoc agreed that the first part of "season 3 ... throws the teams into a ridiculous situation and has limited member interactions, leading to a lack of witty dialogue". In an about.com review of the season 4 DVD, writer Eric Qualls thought that season 3 was "a little too long, and too complicated, and the jokes were a bit too far apart". Nevertheless, both Prince and Jandoc were optimistic that the series would improve, and Qualls stated that the fourth season had "returned to the series' roots" as "some of the funniest stuff you'll ever see". The Globe and Mail reviewer Chad Sapieha complained that season 3 "seemed as though they were trying to come up with more physical gags rather than focusing on the dialogue" before the writing picked up in the following seasons.

Rooster Teeth Productions has created special Red vs. Blue videos for various events. For example, Microsoft has commissioned Red vs. Blue videos for Xbox demo kiosks found in game stores and for a developer conference. Barenaked Ladies has also commissioned videos for their concerts, as frontman Ed Robertson was a fan of the series, and would later voice a character, Captain Butch Flowers. Other videos have been specifically created for gaming magazines, including Electronic Gaming Monthly and Computer Gaming World; gaming conventions, including E3 and the Penny Arcade Expo; and the Sundance Film Festival.

Red vs. Blue has also received praise from soldiers stationed in the Middle East. An August 2005 blog entry by Kimi Matsuzaki of 1UP.com displays photographs of soldiers holding various weapons, as well as copies of the first and second season Red vs. Blue DVDs. Geoff Ramsey later stated in an interview, "We get a lot of merchandise and DVDs out to Iraq and get a lot of great e-mails back."

Red vs. Blue has been acknowledged by Xbox Live through Grifball, a game variant which is featured on the Halo 3 multiplayer; Grifball originated as a joke by Sarge in the 4th season that alluded to inflicting pain on Grif. The notability and impact of Red vs. Blue extends to video games outside the Halo series as well. The developers of the Xbox 360 video game Gears of War, Epic Games, made a reference to a Red vs. Blue gag through an in-game achievement called, "Is it a spider?"; the award is earned for tagging opponents with grenades. Another reference to the series appears on Bungie's website. On a player's Halo 3 profile screen the description of a kill or death with a flag is "Right next to the headlight fluid". In Halo 3 itself, the second campaign scenario features a Red vs. Blue skit, wherein two cast members voice over a soldier attempting to bypass a locked door. Different skits are seen on each difficulty level. In Halo: Reach, Dr. Halsey's office contains a data-file detailing the UNSC's "reaction" to the films. In the expansion pack for Red Dead Redemption: Undead Nightmare, there is an achievement called "Chupathingy," when killing a Chupacabra.

=== Impact on machinima ===
Red vs. Blue is widely credited with attracting public attention to machinima and web-series. The first instance of machinima dates back to the 1990s in the first-person shooter game Quake. A group that called themselves "The Rangers" created a software mod of them typing in the chat box and putting lines of dialogue on the screen. This group named these "videos" Diary of a Camper. Even though Rooster Teeth is not the first to produce machinima, Clive Thompson credited Red vs. Blue as "the first to break out of the underground". Tavares, Gil, and Roque called it machinima's "first big success", and Paul Marino noted that "the series proved so popular that it not only transcended the typical gamer, it also claimed fans outside the gaming world". In 2005, Thompson wrote that "Microsoft has been so strangely solicitous that when it was developing the sequel to Halo last year [2004], the designers actually inserted a special command—a joystick button that makes a soldier lower his weapon—designed solely to make it easier for Rooster Teeth to do dialogue".

Red vs. Blue has motivated the fan base to create the machinima "Sponsors vs. Freeloaders". This series lived on the forums of roosterteeth.com. The series has inspired other machinima productions, including The Codex. Other Halo machinimas that are not necessarily related to, or influenced by, Red vs. Blue are: Arby 'n' the Chief, The Forgotten Spartans, Matchmaking, Spriggs, Rise of the Spartans, Playtime, C n' P, and Sandguardians.

In machinima, Red vs. Blue has been mentioned as the most successful example of the trend toward serial distribution. According to Hugh Hancock, this format allows for gradual improvement as a result of viewer feedback, and gives viewers a reason to return for future videos. Hancock argues that this model was necessary for Red vs. Blue's success: "Sunday night is Red vs. Blue night, just as (in the UK) Thursday used to be Buffy. Had RvB released their films as single downloads of an hour and a half, they'd have had nowhere near the success they currently enjoy." Karen Moltenbrey explains that, machinima films were quite lengthy and were typically not episodic. Rooster Teeth was able to combine these aspects by compiling the episodic adventures into a feature-length film and selling DVDs.

== Distribution ==
Red vs. Blue episodes were originally available in QuickTime (QT) and Windows Media Video (WMV) formats, with the most recent season available at the time in full and episodes from the previous seasons available in a rolling archive, cycling on a weekly basis. This original setup was intended to help to control bandwidth costs; as of September 2005, the official Rooster Teeth website was serving 400 terabytes of data monthly. Video content has now moved to streaming, with initial releases occurring through the website directly, followed by YouTube later on. Red vs. Blue Season 16 was not released to YouTube until March 19, 2019, unlike previous seasons which released on YouTube a week after being made available to FIRST members on the site. Previously it was hosted by Blip, though it has switched over to being hosted directly on the website with Jwplayer acting as its video player, after Blip was shut down. All freely released episodes are currently available and the rolling archive has been retired. Out of Mind was initially a free download on the Xbox Live Marketplace, along with some Red vs. Blue episodes being available purchased. More recently, episodes became available to be streamed on Halo Waypoint.

Members of the official website can become FIRST members, originally referred to as sponsors, for a fee of US$5 every month or US$20 every six months. FIRST members formerly could access videos a day before members can view them and a week before a general public release, but now get to view them a full week before both free members and non-members can view them, as well as the ability to access special content released only to FIRST members. For example, before the premiere of season 12, Rooster Teeth released exclusive audio logs featuring some of the main characters exclusively for FIRST members.

Episodes were originally released in different resolutions; higher resolutions were reserved for FIRST members. Beginning with the Red vs. Blue: Out of Mind mini-series, Rooster Teeth began to film and edit videos in 720p high-definition, and release episodes in widescreen format, instead of hiding the game HUD through the letterboxing seen in fullscreen releases. On January 8, 2007, the release of episode 87, Matt Hullum announced that videos would be viewable using Adobe Flash. He stated that the change allowed Rooster Teeth to release public videos in a higher resolution "while keeping the file size low", and that the entire video archive would be updated. Code to embed the Flash video on other websites was also distributed. In a site journal entry, Burns clarified that downloadable versions would continue to be released, but after their Flash counterparts. Eventually, during Season 10, downloadable episodes ceased to be posted. This was likely to prevent re-uploading episodes onto YouTube ahead of public release.

Although it is distributed serially over the internet, Red vs. Blue is also one of the first commercially released products made using machinima, as opposed to a product merely containing machinima. DVDs (and later Blu-rays) of every completed seasons are sold through Rooster Teeth's official website, as well as at several retailers in the United States, such as Target and Wal-Mart. Rooster Teeth claimed in 2017 that Red vs. Blue has sold more than 1 million DVDs of individual seasons and box sets. Initially each season's episodes were edited together in the DVD releases to play continuously as full-length films, though later seasons were written as singular films with episodes being split up later during production. Because some episodes contain dialogue that continues into or past the episode credits, Rooster Teeth either removes that dialogue entirely or films extra footage to replace the original fade to black. On April 1, 2008, Rooster Teeth released a box set of all five seasons, including a DVD of new bonus content. In 2010, a remastered box set of the first five seasons was released, with the first four seasons being completely reshot, featuring a proper 16:9 aspect ratio instead of the highly letterboxed look of the original episodes, and a much higher resolution. On November 6, 2012, to celebrate ten years, Rooster Teeth released a DVD and Blu-ray box set, titled RVBX, comprising the first ten seasons and five discs worth of bonus content, two of which are almost entirely newly released material.

Theatrical presentations of Red vs. Blue seasons at the Lincoln Center and at other film festivals are cut (sometimes extensively) for time. In a 2005 interview, Burns noted that the first season, normally 75 minutes in length, was cut to 55 minutes for these venues, with an entire episode omitted. Burns stated in a journal entry that the 134-minute season 3 DVD version had to be shortened to "a watchable-in-a-theater runtime of 100 minutes".

The first 5 seasons were made available on Netflix in July 2014, with Seasons 6–12 debuting on the streaming service in April 2015. On March 4, 2015, Rooster Teeth debuted a new YouTube channel dedicated entirely to Red vs. Blue, where the first twelve seasons were uploaded to between March 6–29 in anticipation for the release of the thirteenth season's premiere on April 1, 2015. The channel has over 886 thousand subscribers, and over 268 million video views, as of July 2019. The channel has since been renamed to Rooster Teeth Animation and features other original animated Rooster Teeth productions such as RWBY and Camp Camp.

El Rey Network picked up the entirety of Red vs. Blue in November 2015, with the series premiering on December 5, 2015. Founder Robert Rodriguez called the series a "truly groundbreaking machinima series, with a strong focus on quality writing and pioneering motion capture techniques".

In May 2022, it was announced that FilmRise had acquired streaming rights for Nomad of Nowhere, Camp Camp, and Red vs. Blue, grouping episodes from each series into "traditional half-hour formats and seasons for streaming".

== Bibliography ==
- Academy of Machinima Arts & Sciences (2005). "2005 Award Nominations and Selections". 2005 Machinima Film Festival. Archived from the original on 2006-04-27.
- Bungie.net (2005). "Red vs. Blue : The Interview Strikes Back". Microsoft Corporation. Archived from the original on 2005-12-23.
- Burns, Burnie (August 10, 2005). "It's Official". Red vs. Blue. Rooster Teeth Productions.
- Burns, Burnie (June 16, 2006). "Out of Sight". Red vs. Blue.
- Burns, Burnie (August 1, 2006). "Out of Mind on RvB". Red Vs Blue.
- Burns, Burnie (April 4, 2008). "RVB:Reconstruction". Red vs. Blue.
- Burns, Burnie (writer, director); et al. (2003). Red vs. Blue Season One (DVD). Buda, Texas: Rooster Teeth Productions.
- Burns, Burnie (writer, director); et al. (2004). Red vs. Blue Season Two (DVD). Buda, Texas: Rooster Teeth Productions.
- Choi, Jason (November 5, 2005). "2005 Machinima Film Festival: Winners". Machinima.com.
- Choi, Jason (November 5, 2006). "2006 Machinima Film Festival: WINNERS & Nominees". Machinima.com. Archived from the original on 2009-04-18.
- Delaney, Kevin J. (April 9, 2004). "When Art Imitates Videogames, You Have "Red vs. Blue": Mr. Burns Makes Little Movies Internet Fans Clamor For; Shades of Samuel Beckett". The Wall Street Journal.
- Gameworld Network staff (October 29, 2006). "Halo 3 Details Explosion". GameWorld Network News. Archived from the original on 2007-10-31.
- Halter, Ed (December 31, 2003). "Tracking Shot: The Blood Gulch Chronicles". The Village Voice. Archived from the original on 2007-12-11.
- Hancock, Hugh (November 23, 2004). "Editorial – Serialise This!". Machinima.com. Archived from the original on 2006-06-13.
- Hsu, Dan (November 2006). "War Journal". Electronic Gaming Monthly. No. 209. p. 106.
- Hullum, Matt (January 8, 2007). "RvB 87 in a Flash". Red vs. Blue. Rooster Teeth Productions.
- Jandoc, Wilma (December 5, 2004). ""Red vs. Blue" mines game for comedy gold". Honolulu Star-Bulletin.
- Konow, David (September 24, 2005). "The Cult of Red vs. Blue". TwitchGuru. Tom's Guide Publishing. Archived from the original on 2006-12-31.
- Kosak, Dave (November 16, 2004). "GameSpy Examines the Teeth of the Rooster". GameSpy.
- Leggat, Graham (2006). "Cock Byte: Masters of Machinima". San Francisco International Film Festival. San Francisco Film Society. Archived from the original on 2006-05-28.
- MacGregor, James (2006). "Hugh Hancock, Machinimateur". Shooters Films. Shooting People. Archived from the original on 2006-06-30.
- Marino, Paul (2004). 3D Game-Based Filmmaking: The Art of Machinima. Scottsdale, Arizona: Paraglyph Press. ISBN 1-932111-85-9.
- Marks, Chris (July 9, 2005). "Interview – Burnie Burns and Gus Sorola". The Unofficial Rooster Teeth Productions Resource Site. Archived from the original on 2006-05-10.
- Matsuzaki, Kimi (August 4, 2005). "Big booms and big guns". Kimi Matsuzaki's 1UP Blog. Ziff Davis Media Inc. Archived from the original on 2011-07-07.
- Moltenbrey, Karen (November 2005). "Out of Character". Computer Graphics World. COP Communications.
- Prince, Charlie (August 23, 2005). "Red vs. Blue: The Blood Gulch Chronicles is Hysterically Funny (But Skip the 3rd Season)". Cinema Strikes Back. Archived from the original on 2006-01-18.
- Qualls, Eric (May 22, 2006). "Red vs. Blue Season 4 DVD Review". about.com. The New York Times Company. Archived from the original on 2016-01-08.
- Rigney, Ryan (May 25, 2012). "How Rooster Teeth Won the Internet With Red vs. Blue". Wired.
- Rivas, Eddy; Burns, Burnie (November 17, 2015). Red vs. Blue: The Ultimate Fan Guide. New York: Dey Street Books. ISBN 978-0062355782.
- Smith, Bryan (February 21, 2006). "Burnie Burns Interview". HaloGrid.com. Archived from the original on 2006-06-13.
- Sorola, Gus (June 16, 2006). "Out of Mind". Red vs. Blue.
- Starrs, D. Bruno (2010). "Reverbing: The 'Red vs. Blue' machinima as anti-war film" (PDF). Continuum: Journal of Media & Cultural Studies. 24 (2). New York; London: Routledge: 265–277. doi:10.1080/10304310903548639. ISSN 1030-4312. S2CID 143677842.
- Surette, Tim (April 13, 2007). "Red vs. Blue yuks it up on XBL". GameSpot. CNET Networks.
- Tavares, José Pedro; Gil Riu & Roque, Licino (2005). "Player as Author: conjecturing online game creation modalities and infrastructure". Proceedings of DiGRA 2005 Conference: Changing Views – Worlds in Play. Archived from the original (DOC) on 2006-11-09.
- Thompson, Clive (August 7, 2005). "The Xbox Auteurs". The New York Times.
- Totilo, Stephen (September 28, 2005). "Machinima Pros Make a Living Playing "Halo" — With Their Feet". MTV.com. MTV Networks. Archived from the original on 2006-06-30.
- Waters, Darren (August 7, 2003). "Animators turn to video games". BBC News Online. BBC.
- Whitley, Glenna (January 19, 2006). "Lights, Camera, Play!". Dallas Observer. Archived from the original on 2007-04-08.
