= Lazer Team =

2015 comedy science fiction film directed by Matt Hullum

- Theatrical release poster
- Directed by: Matt Hullum
- Screenplay by: Burnie Burns; Chris Demarais; Josh Flanagan; Matt Hullum
- Story by: Burnie Burns
- Produced by: Doreen Copeland; Burnie Burns; Matt Hullum
- Starring: Burnie Burns; Gavin Free; Michael Jones; Colton Dunn; Allie DeBerry; Alan Ritchson
- Cinematography: Philip Roy
- Edited by: Chris Demarais; Josh Flanagan; Aaron Marquis; David James Ward
- Music by: Jeff Williams
- Production company: Rooster Teeth
- Distributed by: Fullscreen Films; YouTube Premium (Online); Amplify; Tugg (Theatrical)
- Release dates: September 24, 2015 (Fantastic Fest); January 27, 2016 (United States); February 10, 2016 (YouTube Premium)
- Running time: 102 minutes
- Country: United States
- Language: English
- Budget: $2.4 million
- Box office: $1.6 million

Lazer Team is a 2015 American science fiction action comedy film directed, produced, and co-written by Matt Hullum. The first feature film produced by Rooster Teeth, it stars Burnie Burns, Gavin Free, Michael Jones, Colton Dunn, Allie DeBerry, and Alan Ritchson. The film follows the Lazer Team, a group of four who find themselves responsible for the fate of the planet upon discovering an alien crash site containing a battle suit.

The film was produced by Hullum, Burns, and Doreen Copeland. Burns and Hullum also co-wrote the script, alongside Rooster Teeth employees Chris Demarais and Josh Flanagan. Funding for Lazer Team was largely raised through a successful Indiegogo campaign, raising over $2.4 million in a month. Filming began in October 2014, with principal photography taking place in Austin and New Mexico.

Lazer Team premiered at Fantastic Fest on September 24, 2015. Through Amplify and Tugg, the film was theatrically released on January 27, 2016, as a cinema-in-demand model. The film was released onto YouTube Premium a month later, and was added to Rooster Teeth's FIRST streaming service on November 3, 2017. Lazer Team received mixed reviews and grossed $1.6 million on a $2.4 million budget. A sequel, Lazer Team 2, was released on November 13, 2017.

== Plot ==
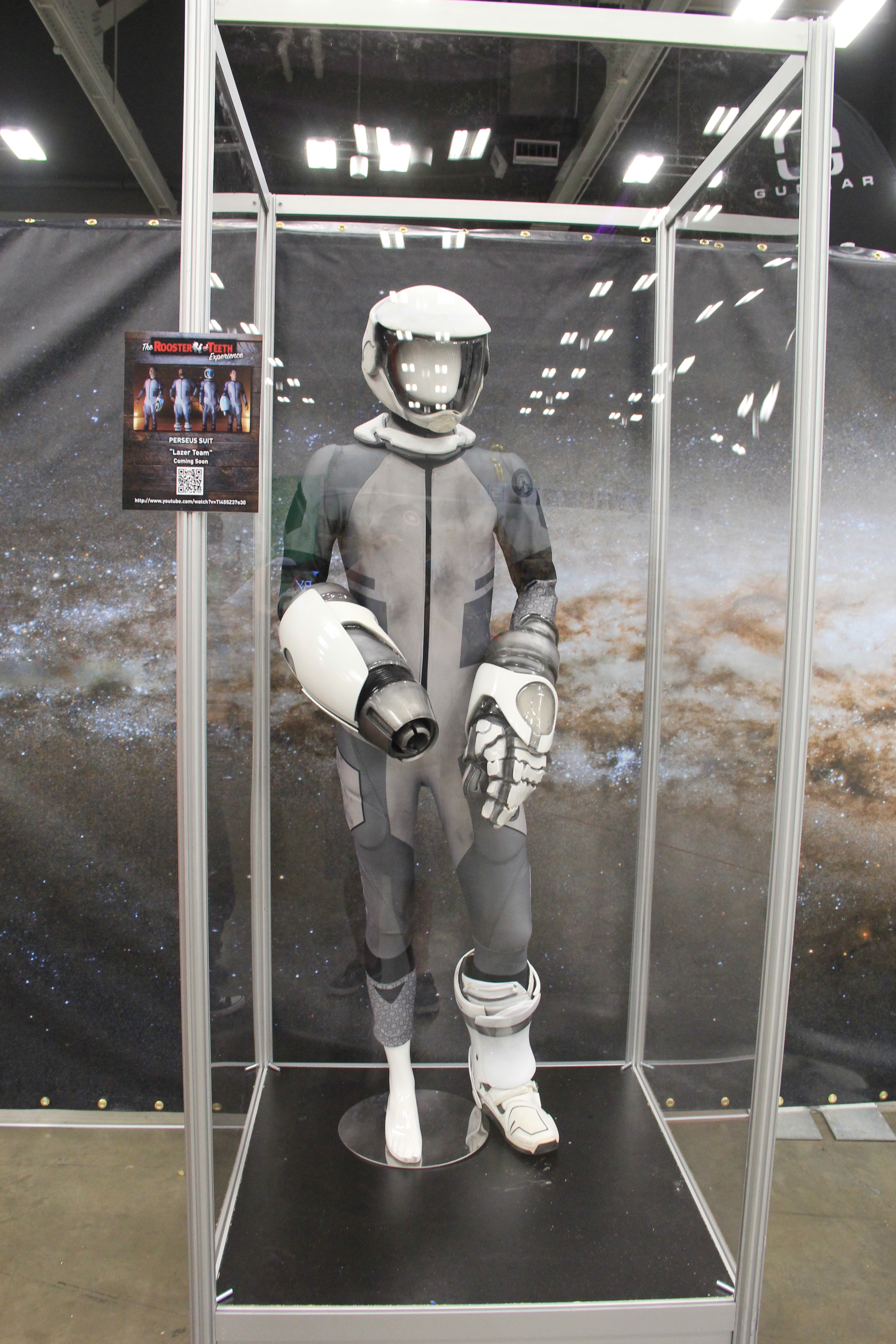
The suit of power on display

In 1977, the government has secretly decoded a transmission, sent by the alien Antareans, which warns of a deadly race known as the Worg, coming to destroy Earth. To help defend Earth, the Antareans have sent a powerful battle suit for the "Champion of Earth" to wear, and the government begins training a boy named Adam from birth to be the Champion. Thirty-eight years later, Officer Anthony Hagan arrests Zach Spencer for causing trouble at a party and begins to drive him away, only to find Woody Johnson and Herman Mendoza shooting off unauthorized fireworks. Herman defiantly launches a massive rocket which strikes an incoming UFO and causes it to crash nearby.

The UFO opens to reveal the battle suit, and the four men each take a piece of it. The suit activates when all four pieces are worn, and each piece becomes irreversibly and genetically locked to its wearer. They discover Zach's arm-cannon can shoot energy projectiles, Hagan's gauntlet can create an energy field, Woody's helmet increases his intelligence over time, and Herman's boots can make him run at superhuman speeds. The military shows up and apprehends the group. Angry that their preparations have been jeopardized and that Zach has posted a selfie with the suit (calling the four "Lazer Team"), Colonel Emory gives Adam orders to train them in only four days, after which time the Worg are scheduled to arrive. Meanwhile, a group of soldiers are possessed by small robotic insects sent by the Worg, and begin to hunt down Lazer Team and possess Mindy, Hagan's daughter.

The officers in charge decide to try and amputate the suit from the team, but when brought to the hospital, they escape using the suit's abilities. They are intercepted by Adam, but they work together to create a strong energy shield and knock him unconscious. After escaping, they hide out in Hagan's ex-wife's cabin. Zach calls the Worg-controlled Mindy on Skype and gives her his location. She arrives and attacks the group, but they subdue her and Woody communicates with the Worg through the device on the back of her neck. Before they can finish negotiating, Zach rips the device off and it self-destructs, destroying the cabin. They are then pursued by the possessed soldiers, but escape.

The team goes on their way to Zach and Mindy's high school, where they find that an Antarean ship has arrived and is over the town's football field, creating a giant forcefield around it. The Worg transmit a message, calling the Champions of Earth to battle. Lazer Team is once again ambushed by the possessed soldiers, but they use teamwork to kill all four of them. With the pressure of saving the planet weighing down on them, they decide to hide except for Hagan, who turns himself in to the military. However, now seeing the full potential in the team, Adam frees Hagan and they sneak to the stadium where a crowd has formed around the UFO. They find the rest of the team there and regroup, hijacking a police car and ramming it into the forcefield to successfully reach the football field.

The Worg warrior arrives in an identical suit of armor. Woody intercepts a transmission from the ship, revealing that rather than a war they are part of an elimination tournament where the Antareans destroy the losers' planets until one remains. Lazer Team proves unsuccessful at defeating the Worg by themselves, so Adam begins a distraction using riot gear from the police car. The Worg fires a dark matter beam, disintegrating Adam but indirectly teaching the team how to achieve this with the suit. Lazer Team and the Worg fire dark matter beams into each other, creating a vortex. The four separated suit pieces malfunction and Lazer Team is blown clear of the forcefield, but the Worg and the Antarean ship are consumed. The team is greeted by a huge crowd outside. Emory arrives and states that the war isn't over, and that Lazer Team is going into space.

== Cast ==
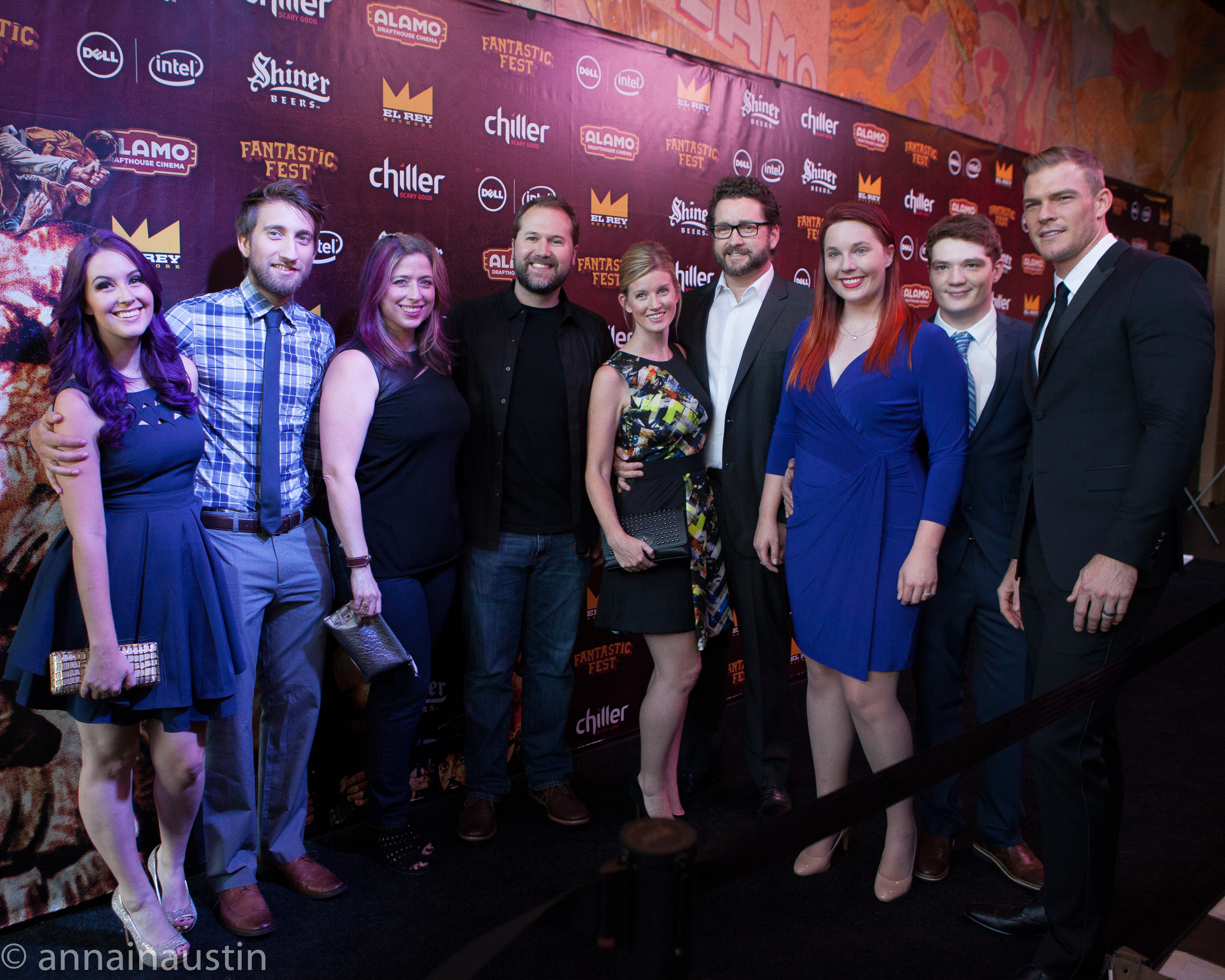
The cast at the film's premiere at Fantastic Fest 2015

- Burnie Burns as Anthony Hagan, a traffic cop and a member of Lazer Team. Hagan wears the left arm of the suit, allowing him to generate an energy shield.
- Gavin Free as Woody Johnson, a member of Lazer Team. Woody wears the helmet of the suit, heightening his intelligence and granting him other enhancements such as X-ray vision.
- Michael Jones as Zach Spencer, a member of Lazer Team and Mindy's boyfriend. Zach wears the right arm of the suit, which is an energy cannon.
- Colton Dunn as Herman Mendoza, a former football athlete and a member of Lazer Team. Herman wears the boots of the suit, which let him run at superhuman speeds.
- Jeremy St. James as Bean
- Allie DeBerry as Mindy Hagan, Anthony's daughter, and the girlfriend of Zach.
- Alan Ritchson as Adam, the Champion of the Earth
- Steve Shearer as Colonel Emory, the commanding officer Project Perseus.
- Kirk Johnson as Officer Vandenbloom
- Benjamin Scott as General Cale
- Johnny Walter as Murdoch, the leader of a group of Project Perseus soldiers who are taken over by Worg parasites.
- Chris Demarais as Franksen

The film also contains cameos from many other actors, most of them employees at Rooster Teeth. These cameos include Barbara Dunkelman, Lindsay Jones, Arryn Zech, Kara Eberle, Jon Risinger, Josh Flanagan, Matt Hullum, Gus Sorola, Shannon McCormick, Blaine Gibson, Brandon Farmahini, Joel Heyman, Yomary Cruz, Kerry Shawcross, Adam Ellis, Trevor Collins and Miles Luna. Country musician Dale Watson, film critic and Space Jam animator Korey Coleman, astrophysicist Neil deGrasse Tyson, YouTuber Justine Ezarik, improvisational comedian Tom Booker, and Barenaked Ladies lead singer Ed Robertson also have cameos in the film.

== Production ==
=== Development ===
The concept for Rooster Teeth's first live action feature was in development as early as 2010. It was first announced at Halo Fest during PAX Prime 2011. Burns stated they were drawing inspirations from, "a lot of the sci-fi classics that we've grown up with," but were, "not making a parody and we're not making a send-up – we're making our own movie." Influences on the script included "team movies" such as The Mighty Ducks and Cool Runnings. According to co-writers Chris Demarais and Josh Flanagan, the third act was completely restructured by them a week before shooting began.

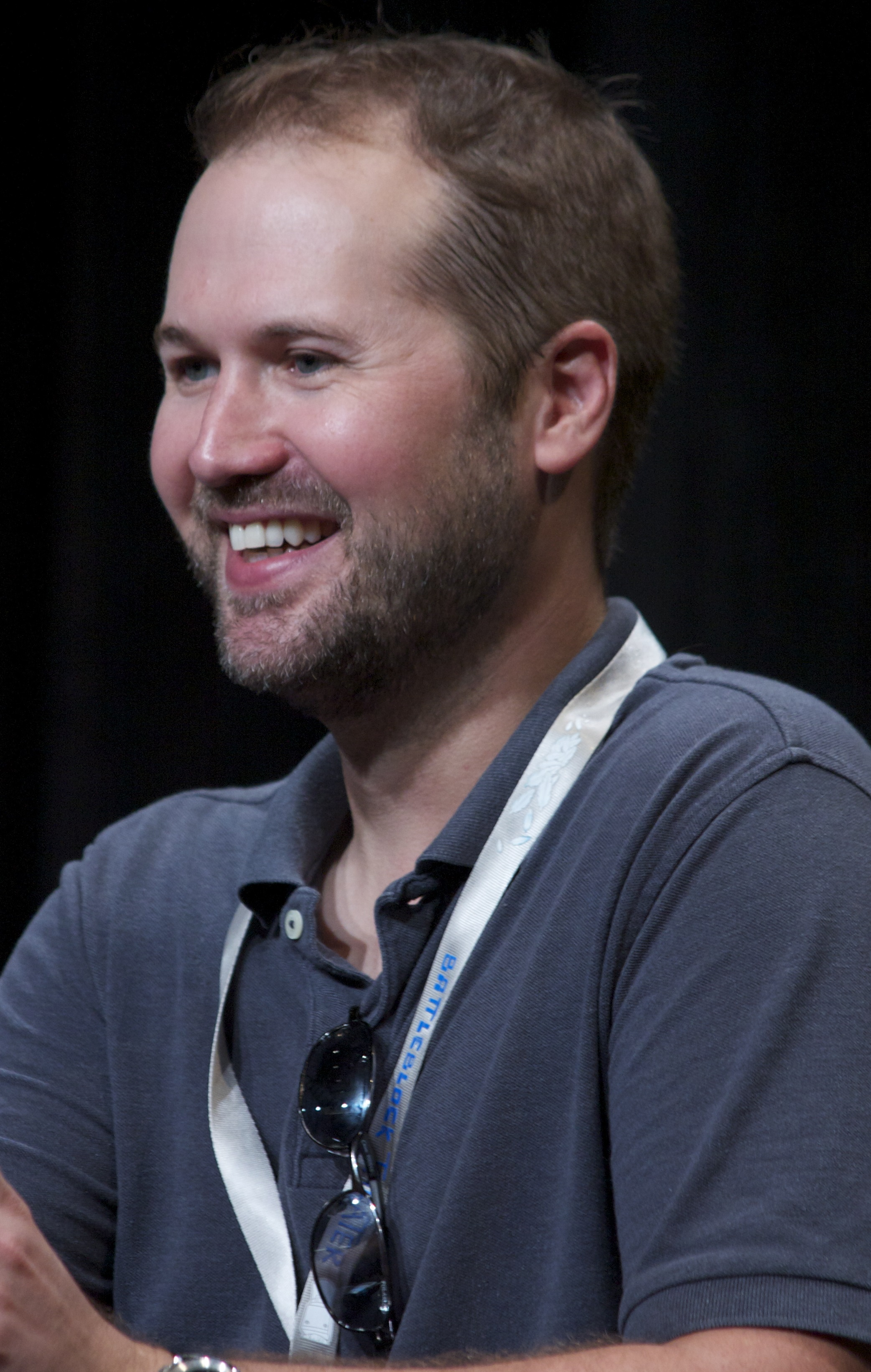
Lazer Team is the second feature film directed by Rooster Teeth CEO Matt Hullum.

While writing the story, Burns did not imagine himself playing Hagan, saying "I tend to be a bigger, loud-mouthed, talk-fast kind of guy ... I had to essentially take it down a notch to play him."

In February 2014, Burns confirmed the company was going to launch a crowdfunding campaign for the film as a way to offer more support options while gaining publicity. Freddie Wong was a consultant in shaping their campaign. The Indiegogo page for the film launched in June 2014. The fundraiser reached its $650,000 goal in under 10 hours and broke Indiegogo's record for the fastest film campaign to reach $700,000. Within three days, Lazer Team broke $1 million. Lazer Team holds the record for the highest funded film campaign on Indiegogo with over $2.4 million collected. On the final day of the campaign, Rooster Teeth released a special perk for a single fan to be cast in a walk-on role; within 20 seconds of the perk going live, 535 people purchased the perk, as it slowed the site's ticketing system. All 535 people were used for a crowd scene in the film. Hullum stated that the crew had been contacted by multiple distribution companies, media companies, and acting agencies since the campaign began. Burns corroborated, explaining that the film's budget increased as the campaign earned more money:

The initial budget for talent was based on making the movie on the bare minimum with us throwing in the remainder of the expected budget. For instance, that meant using talent almost exclusively from in-house. As the budget grows, so do our opportunities to approach all kinds of talent. The same applies to Visual FX, quality of props and costuming, lighting, crew, etc.

Casting calls and auditions for minor speaking roles in were held for attendees at RTX 2014. Additional casting for extras was held during shooting. Blaine Gibson also auditioned for the role of Zach.

=== Filming ===
Principal photography began on October 14, 2014. Filming took place over 40 days in Austin and New Mexico. During the first week of production, filming took place at the Austin National Guard Armory, as well as the University of Texas at Austin. Filming wrapped on December 13. Reshoots started in late February 2015.

To avoid interrupting Achievement Hunter's online video schedule, Free and Jones pre-recorded content for a month prior to filming. During filming, both came into the office, "half the days that we had off" to film videos instead of sleeping for a few hours before returning to set.

== Release ==
Lazer Team premiered in Austin at Fantastic Fest, on September 24, 2015, followed by a Canadian premiere at the Toronto After Dark Film Festival on October 16, a European premiere at the Film4 FrightFest on October 24, and an Australian premiere at RTX Australia on January 22, 2016. Lazer Team was among the first titles in Fullscreen's newly launched feature film division. Lazer Team had a limited theatrical release on January 27–28, 2016, in the United States, Canada, United Kingdom, Ireland, Australia, and New Zealand. The theaters were selected through the Tugg platform, which determines the interest of a screening at a specific theater. It set a Tugg record in Australia when it sold 800 tickets to a single theatre at Event Cinemas' George Street, in Sydney.

The film reportedly grossed $1 million through pre-sale tickets. From February 10, 2016, the film was available for streaming as part of YouTube's new paid subscription service YouTube Red. On November 3, 2017, shortly before the release of the sequel, Lazer Team was made available for FIRST members on Rooster Teeth's website.

== Reception ==
=== Box office ===
Lazer Team played in theaters as a cinema-in-demand model where if fans gathered a certain number of people who wanted to see the film, the producers would find a theater for a one-time showing event. The distributors managed 480 screenings (for one night only) in both the U.S. and abroad. The picture was also four-walled for a 35-screen run in the U.S. It was played 47 times in the UK and fans lined up around the block. In Australia, it screened 65 times. Lazer Team ended up grossing over $1.1 million in the U.S. and over $1.6 million globally, according to Rentrak. The film was unable to recoup its 2.4 million dollar budget in the theatrical window.

=== Critical response ===
On Rotten Tomatoes, the film has an approval rating of 62%, based on 34 reviews. On Metacritic, the film has a weighted average score of 42 out of 100, based on 14 critics, indicating "mixed or average" reviews.

Scott Weinberg, writing for Nerdist, praised the film's amiable, '80s tone and "surprisingly nifty" effects, calling it "a good deal of quaint, geeky fun." Matt Donato of We Got This Covered dubbed it, "the Anti-Pixels." Marc Savlov from The Austin Chronicle gave it a mixed review, writing "Sharply edited while ranging all over the comic map – Lazer Team has its share of groaners, to be sure – it's a solid debut from Austin's gaming and comedy hometown heroes." New York Times Neil Genzlinger criticized the film saying "Lazer Team ends by setting itself up for a sequel, but that's mighty wishful thinking" and "What they—or the men playing them—really need to learn to do is act."

Matt Fagerholm of RogerEbert.com heavily criticized the film, writing "This movie is, in essence, a product of fame and money without the slightest tangible shred of effort."

== Sequel ==
On August 5, 2016, Burns and Free announced that a sequel to Lazer Team was green-lit by Rooster Teeth in partnership with YouTube Red, and that pre-production had begun. The film was released in theaters on November 13, 2017, and on YouTube Red on November 22, 2017.
