= Nico Audy-Rowland =

French composer and musician

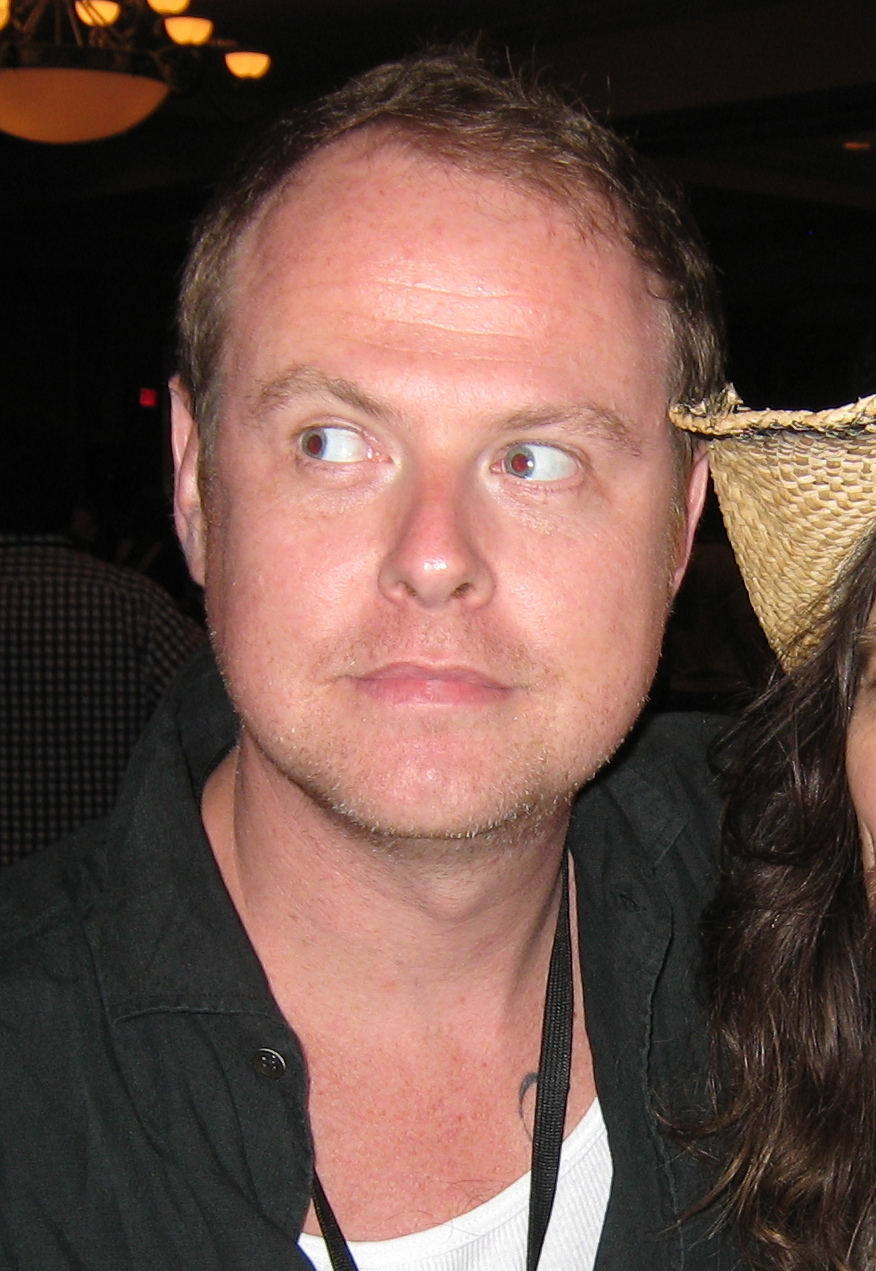
- Nico Audy-Rowland at Rooster Teeth Expo, 2011

Background information
- Born: Nicolas Audy-Rowland
- Origin: Saint Barthélemy, Caribbean
- Genres: Experimental rock
- Occupations: Musician, songwriter
- Instruments: Vocals, guitar, keyboards
- Years active: 1997–present
- Member of: Trocadero

Nico Audy-Rowland is a French musician, originally from Saint Barthélemy in the Caribbean. He is the founder of alternative rock band Trocadero.

Born in Saint Barthélemy, Audy-Rowland moved to the United States as a teenager. He has also been involved in writing theme and incidental music for the web series Red vs. Blue, and has contributed remotely to the soundtrack for many years. He also contributed music to the film Lazer Team and the web series RWBY.

He currently lives in Seattle.
