= Yairi =

Yairi is the surname name of three Japanese luthiers associated with quality handmade acoustic guitars.

In the 1960s and 1980s, Sadao Yairi made guitars under the S. Yairi brand. His son Hiroshi Yairi made acoustic guitars under Sadao's supervision (usually signed and/or stamped as by S. Yairi). Sadao was uncle of Kazuo Yairi, who built guitars mostly under his own brand, K. Yairi.

Now all S . Yairi guitars made in China and the K. Yairi ones in Japan.
