= Griffon Ramsey =

American chainsaw carving artist (born 1980)

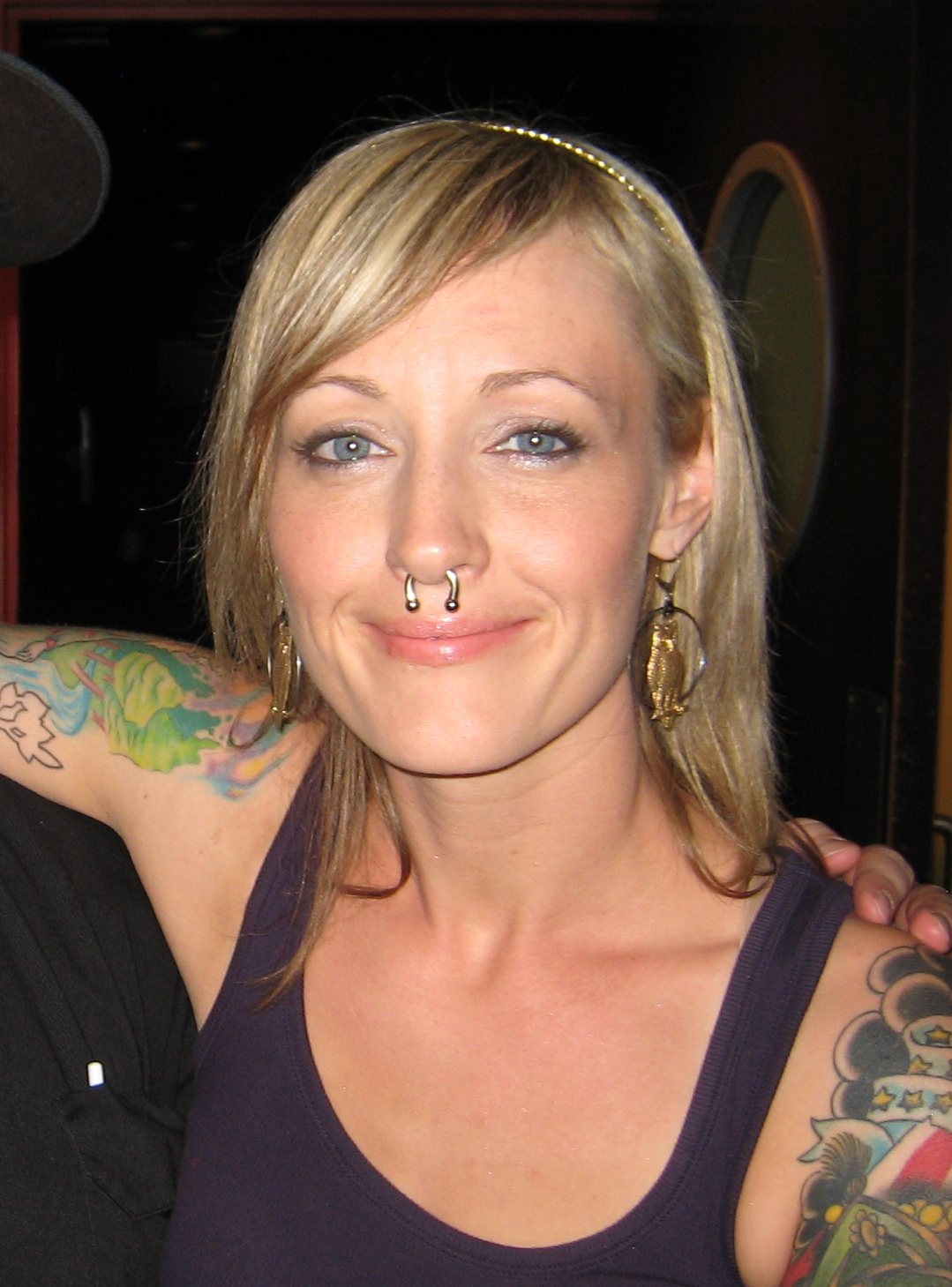
- Ramsey at RTX 2011
- Born: April 23, 1980 (age 46); Eugene, Oregon, U.S.
- Occupation: Artist
- Movement: Chainsaw art
- Spouse: Geoff Ramsey (m. 2005; div. 2018)
- Children: 1

YouTube information
- Channel: GriffonRamsey
- Years active: 2011–present
- Subscribers: 67.1 thousand
- Views: 4.2 million
- Last updated: July 22, 2024
- Website: griffonramsey.com

Griffon E. Ramsey (formerly O'Connell; born April 23, 1980) is an American chainsaw carving artist known for her pop-culture wood sculptures which have appeared at the Australian Chainsaw Carving Championships and the Butler Chainsaw Carving Invitational. Chip Chats magazine described her as a "world-famous" artist with an, "edgy and bold style" while VICE and Uproxx called her a "rock star of the art world" and noted her status as a female in a largely male-dominated field.

Several of her YouTube videos have attracted attention online, including her sculpting an Eastern red cedar into Groot from Guardians of the Galaxy, which accumulated over 115,000 views in three days. As of October 2023, her channel has over 4 million video views and 68,000 subscribers.

== Background ==
Griffon Ramsey grew up in Oregon and was inspired by the carvings she saw as a child, including those of her grandfather. She graduated summa cum laude in 2008 from Texas State University with a BFA in Theatre and began chain-saw sculpting in 2011. Her first chainsaw was a gift from her husband, Geoff Ramsey. She was mentored by Disneyland parks wood designer R.L. Blair. Ramsey has stated that Griffon is not her birth name, having legally changed it while considering transitioning. She has since refused to acknowledge or disclose what her birth name is as she no longer feels a connection to that name and prefers Griffon.

Prior to wood sculpting, Ramsey designed and painted playground markings at elementary schools in the Austin Independent School District in order to promote active learning. The project was done in collaboration with Burl Norville and the University of Texas School of Public Health to, "utilize playground stencils to encourage physical activity."

Ramsey worked for several years at Rooster Teeth Productions, during which time she created the video series Pajamachievements for Achievement Hunter, wrote and co-created Rooster Teeth Comics with artist Luke McKay, oversaw production design work and acted on series such as Immersion and RT Shorts, and was a frequent guest on the Rooster Teeth Podcast. She announced her departure from the company in October 2011.

In 2013, Ramsey was the Production Designer on the indie film Grow Up, Tony Phillips. In 2014, Ramsey, alongside her then-husband, Geoff Ramsey, and friend Gavin Free, starred in the Rooster Teeth series Happy Hour. In 2016, Ramsey starred in the Achievement Hunter Dungeons & Dragons web series Heroes and Halfwits. In 2017, Ramsey would play The Griffon in the Rooster Teeth web series The Eleven Little Roosters.

In January 2017, it was announced that she was teaming up with her then-husband for a new monthly podcast, titled Relationship Goals, about modern relationships and love, starting on Valentine's Day (February 14). In November 2017, Ramsey confirmed on Twitter that she and Geoff Ramsey were in the process of a divorce.

== Filmography ==
=== Web series ===
Year	Title	Role	Notes
2008	Red vs. Blue	Dexter Grif	Voice, one episode
2010–2011	Immersion	Herself	
2010–2011	Rooster Teeth Shorts	Herself	
2014–2016	Happy Hour	Herself	
2016–present	Heroes and Halfwits	Orma	
2017	The Eleven Little Roosters	The Griffon	

=== Podcasts ===
Year	Title	Notes
2010–2011	Rooster Teeth Podcast	
2016	Off Topic	
2016	Always Open	
2017	Relationship Goals	

== Works ==
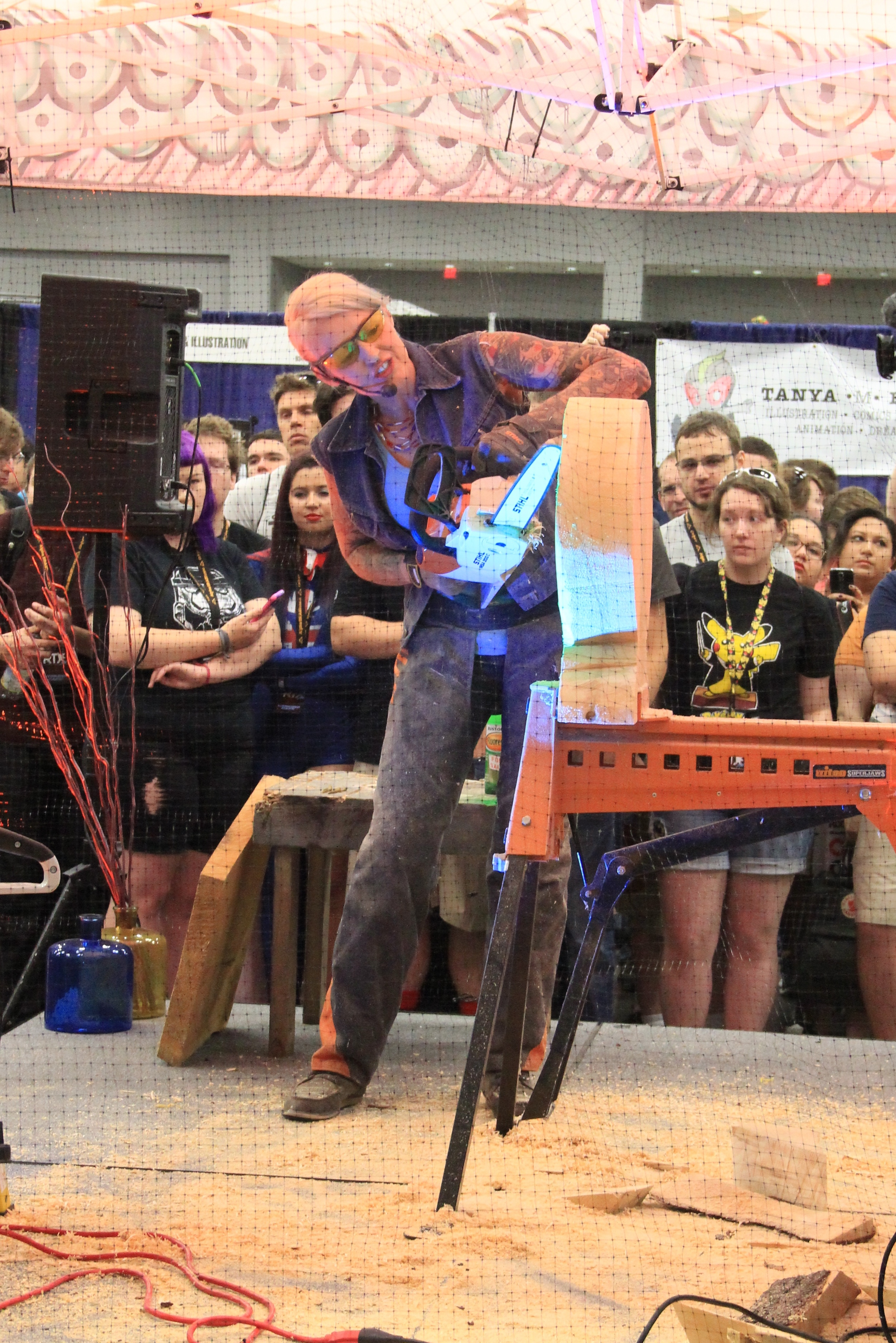
Ramsey working on a carving before an audience at RTX 2015.

Griffon Ramsey uses a variety of chainsaws to create a "rustic" look and various angle grinders, sanders, and Dremels for details and likes a combination of burning, staining, and painting to emphasize nuances.

Ramsey takes suggestions for carvings from fans via her Twitter feed. She edits videos which she posts to her YouTube channel, highlighting the process behind each individual carving and explaining the motivations behind each piece.

Ramsey draws inspiration from, "street artists, folk artists, wood carvers, tinkerers, and in general, the self-taught, her work comes from a compulsive need to rearrange her environment and manifest the reality she would like to see." Of her work, Gio Sasso commented, "Nobody thinks of a chainsaw as an elegant tool for fine detailed work but in the hands of Griffon it seems to be... Griffon is a fantastic artist in her own right." When asked about what she finds interesting about chainsaw carving she responded, "beyond just what I can do with it— is that it's also this performance art... it feels like there's two different things happening at the same time. It's the creation of the artifact or the byproduct of the experience."

Her original carving of an archeologist finding a genie, titled Professor Morris Finds a Lamp, received praise from Butler Chainsaw Carving Invitational organizer Damian Skal and was the most complicated sculpture she had completed.

In October 2011, her carving of the Crimson Omen logo from the Gears of War franchise attracted attention from multiple gaming sites and was called, "the most apropos Gears of War tribute ever" by Kotaku.

In October 2014, her video of sculpting an Eastern red cedar into Groot, based on the tree-like character from Marvel's Guardians of the Galaxy, accumulated over 115,000 views in three days and was posted to many geek culture sites, including Gizmodo, io9 and Geekologie. In November 2014, she drew attention for carving Elsa from Disney's Frozen after being inspired by her daughter's love of the character. In December 2014, Ramsey was invited by Stihl to carve a special piece celebrating the company's 40th Anniversary.

In January 2015 Ramsey participated in the Australian Chainsaw Carving Championships, carving a story book from The Neverending Story, for which she won the People's Choice Award. In February 2015, she attracted attention within the gaming community for carving Majora's Mask, a life-sized replica of the facepiece from The Legend of Zelda: Majora's Mask. In September 2015 Ramsey participated in the Scottish Open Chainsaw Carving Championships.
