= Gus Sorola =

American actor

Gustavo Sorola
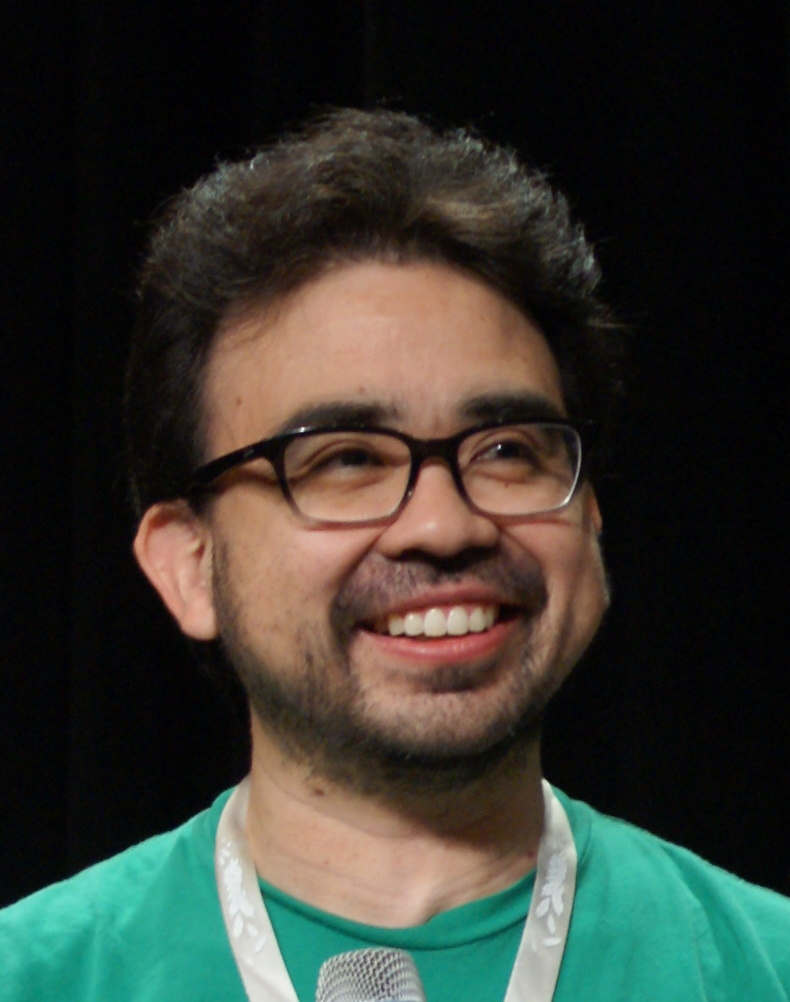
- Sorola at RTX 2013
- Born: Gustavo Raul Sorola III; February 22, 1978 (age 48); Austin, Texas, U.S.
- Occupations: Actor, podcast host
- Years active: 2003–present
- Employer: Rooster Teeth
- Notable work: Red vs. Blue; Rooster Teeth Podcast; Black Box Down
- Spouse: Esther Sorola

Gustavo Raul "Gus" Sorola III (born February 22, 1978) is an American actor and podcast host.

== Early life ==
Sorola was born in Austin, and raised in Eagle Pass, Texas, near the Mexico–United States border. After choosing to drop out from Rice University, he started working at a tech support company, teleNetwork, where he met Rooster Teeth co-founders Burnie Burns and Geoff Ramsey.

== Career ==
Sorola was a founding member of Rooster Teeth Productions, appearing in many of their productions. Sorola was employed by Rooster Teeth until their closure in May 2024. Since 2003, he has voiced the character of Richard Simmons in the machinima series Red vs. Blue. He was also a voice actor in The Strangerhood from 2004 to 2006. His live-action credits include Rooster Teeth Shorts, which started in 2009, and Immersion, which started in 2010. He also starred in three RT Docs: Unconventional, Why We're Here, and Common Ground.

Sorola had also managed and hosted the Rooster Teeth Podcast (formerly known as the Drunk Tank) from its inception in 2008 until his final episode as the regular host on June 5, 2023. On the podcast, Sorola shared many anecdotes about his life, including his childhood and early career. He was also part of several other podcasts such as The Patch, Let Me Clarify, and Heroes & Halfwits. Since March 2020 he has co-hosted the award-winning podcast Black Box Down. Sorola was nominated for Host of the Year at the 2022 Quill Podcast Awards for his work on Black Box Down. In May 2022 he began co-hosting the ANMA podcast.

== Personal life ==
Sorola is married and lives in Austin, Texas with their dog, Oswald. He is an ordained minister of the Universal Life Church and has performed several marriages for his friends and colleagues.

A self-proclaimed fan of Bungie "since Minotaur: The Labyrinths of Crete", Sorola was instrumental in making Rooster Teeth fans of Halo, the series in which Red vs. Blue is made, as when he, Burns, Ramsey and Matt Hullum visited E3 2001, Sorola made them visit the Bungie booth, featuring a Halo: Combat Evolved demo.

== Filmography ==
=== Film ===
Year	Title	Role	Notes
2015	Lazer Team	Scientist	
2017	Lazer Team 2	Scientist	
2024	Red vs. Blue: Restoration	Simmons	Voice; Direct-to-Video

=== Television ===
Year	Title	Role	Notes
2014	@midnight	Himself	Contestant
2017	Bill Nye Saves the World	Himself	Episode: "Cheat Codes for Reality"

=== Web ===
Year	Title	Role	Notes
2003–2020	Red vs. Blue	Simmons, Gene	Voice; also producer
2004–2006, 2015	The Strangerhood	Mister Mystery	Voice; credited as Gustavo Sorola
2008–2023	Rooster Teeth Podcast	Himself (host)	
2009–2020	Rooster Teeth Shorts	Himself	
2010–2015	Immersion	Himself	
2012–2013	The Gauntlet	Himself	
2014	X-Ray and Vav	X-Ray's Mom	Voice
2014	Ten Little Roosters	Gus	
2016	Crunch Time	Bartender	Episode: "The Beginning"
2017	The Eleven Little Roosters	So'Rolla	
2020	RWBY	Fiona's Uncle	
2023–present	Stinky Dragon Adventures	Catawumpus, Rusty, Scuz, additional voices	Voice

=== Video games ===
Year	Title	Role
2007	Halo 3	Additional Voices
2016	Marvel Avengers Academy	Hawkeye
