= Lindsay Jones (actor) =

American actor (born 1989)

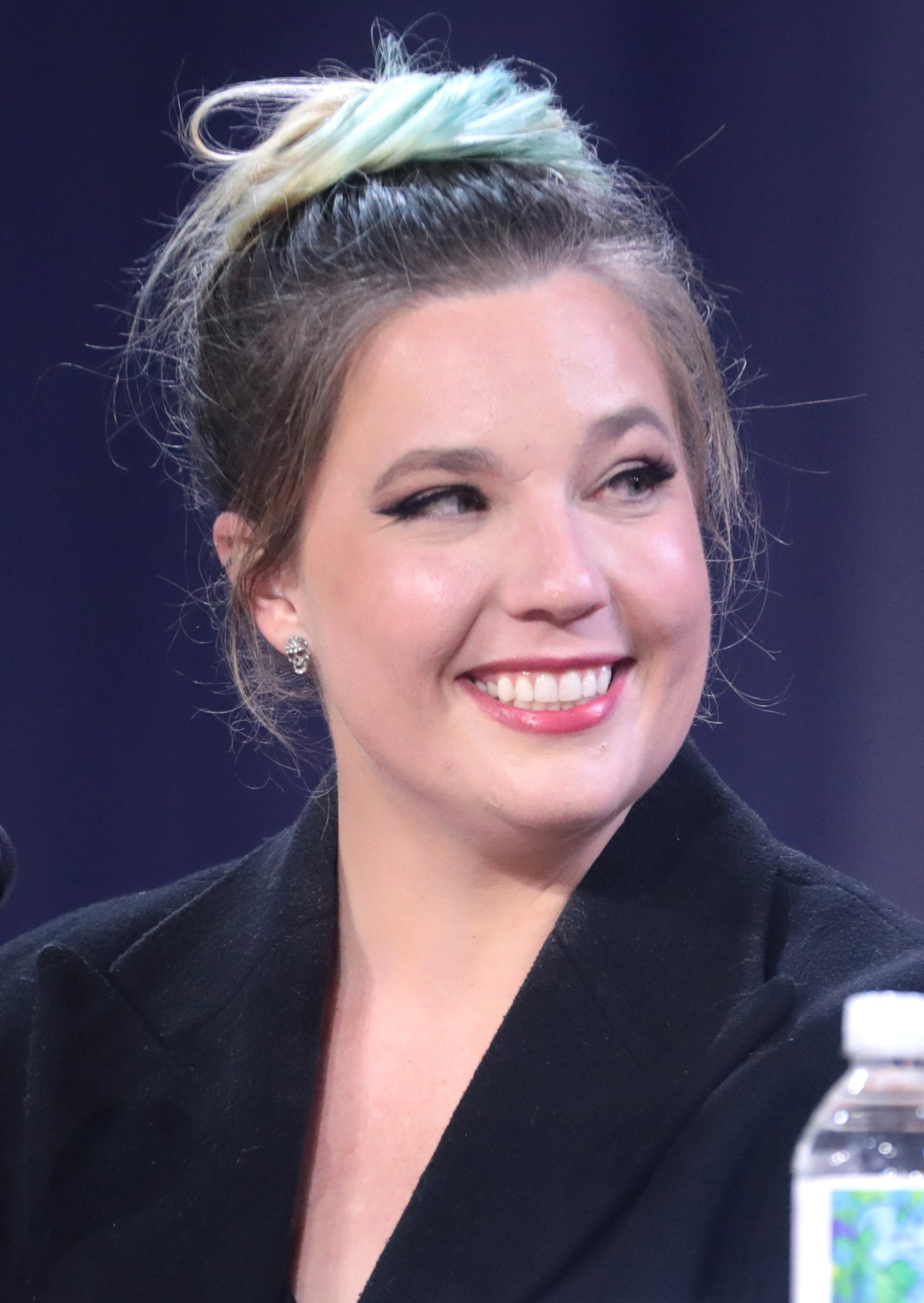
- Jones at the 2023 WonderCon
- Born: Lindsay Elise Tuggey; September 6, 1989 (age 37); Southlake, Texas, U.S.
- Education: University of Texas at Austin
- Occupations: Actress; director
- Years active: 2011–present
- Employer: Rooster Teeth
- Spouse: Michael Jones (m. 2014)
- Children: 2

Lindsay Elise Jones (née Tuggey; born September 6, 1989) is an American actor, director, gamer and host. They (Note: Jones uses they/them and she/her pronouns. This article uses they/them for consistency.) are known for their work with Rooster Teeth, and have provided the voices of Ruby Rose in RWBY and Kimball in Red vs. Blue from 2013–2024.

== Life and career ==
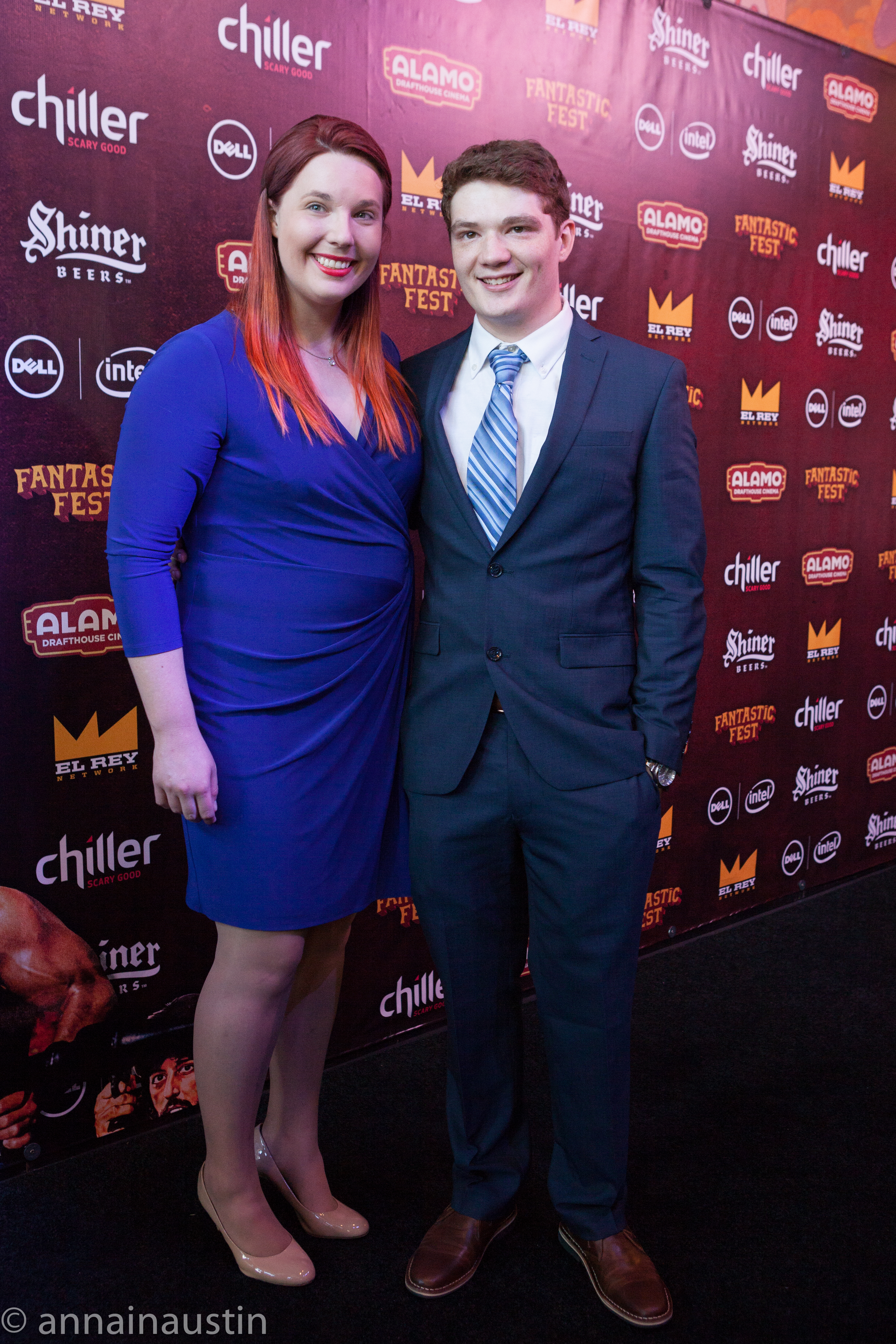
Jones and their husband Michael in 2015

Jones was born September 6, 1989, and raised in Dallas, Texas. They attended, and graduated, the University of Texas at Austin. While acting at the University of Texas, they used the stage name of Lindsay Kavlin.

Jones later joined Rooster Teeth Productions, where they spent much of their time working on videos in the Achievement Hunter division. They were a director, writer and voice actor on X-Ray and Vav, a cartoon series by Rooster Teeth. Additionally, Jones was the primary manager of Rooster Teeth's video gaming website Achievement Hunter, and has appeared in many other Rooster Teeth productions such as Ten Little Roosters and On the Spot. In April 2012, they were added to the cast of three-time Podcast Award winner Internet Box.

In the 2019 companion book to the series, Jones said that they were attached to the podcast for Rooster Teeth as an audio editor and became friends with Monty Oum, with both talking about video games and anime for hours, and he presented the role of Ruby to them in the process. In the same book, Jones also recalled that Oum said they were socially awkward like Ruby and that they channeled the innocence of the character during their recordings, focusing on the performance rather than the tone.

== Personal life ==
Jones married their long-time boyfriend Michael Jones on May 9, 2014.

During Rooster Teeth's 2016 Extra Life livestream, the couple announced that they were expecting a daughter, due in June 2017. The couple's first daughter was born in May 2017. At RTX 2018, Jones announced that they were expecting a second child due in February 2019. The couple's second daughter was born in February 2019.

In 2019, they hosted the SXSW Gaming Awards. In December 2020, Jones came out as non-binary, and stated they prefer they/them pronouns, though they are "okay with" she/her. In 2025, they also began using the nickname “Jax” as part of their non-binary identity.

== Filmography ==
=== Films ===
Year	Title	Role	Notes
2015	Lazer Team	Cheerleader/Additional voices	Feature film
2023	Justice League x RWBY: Super Heroes & Huntsmen	Ruby Rose	Voice; Direct-to-Video
2024	Red vs. Blue Restoration	Kimball	Voice; Direct-to-Video

=== Web series ===
Year	Title	Role	Notes
2012–2019	Rooster Teeth Animated Adventures	Themself, Lindsay	(archive footage, Season 2; 9) role; one episode
2012–2014, 2016	Internet Box	Themself	Guest host (Episode 22, 28); Main cast (Episode 30–126)
2013–2019	Red vs. Blue	Kimball	Guest role (Season 11, 14–15, 17), main role (Season 12–13)
2013–present	RWBY	Ruby Rose	Main
2014	Ten Little Roosters	Themself (Fictional Version)	
2014–2015	Immersion	Themself	
2014–2015	X-Ray and Vav	Hilda	Director and writer
2015	The Strangerhood	Samantha	Season 2
2016–2018; 2021	RWBY Chibi	Ruby Rose	Main
2016–2024	Camp Camp	Space Kid (Neil Armstrong, Jr.)	Main
2017	The Eleven Little Roosters	Little Boss' split personality	Uncredited
2018	Overlord	Imina	Season 3
2018; 2025	Death Battle	Sayla Mass, Ruby Rose	2 episodes
2019	gen:LOCK	Razzle	Season 1 episode 1
2021	RWBY: Fairy Tales	Ruby Rose	one episode
2022	RWBY: Ice Queendom	Ruby Rose	Main; English dub
2023–2024	RWBY-Vtubing	Ruby Rose	Main
2023	Crunchyroll-Hime	Ruby Rose	Guest; 2 Episodes
2023	Stinky Dragon Adventures	Bit	one episode
2024	RWBY: The Grimm Campaign	Tacocat	Podcast; one Episode
2024	RWBY Beyond	Ruby Rose	2 episodes
2025–present	Aphmau	Zena	
2025	100% Eat	Themself	Podcast
TBA	The Legend of Maya	Lissa	one episode

=== Video games ===
Year	Title	Role	Notes
2013	LocoCycle	Nicaraguan Cocktail Partier	Cameo (as "Lindsay Tuggey")
2014	Smite	Ruby Rose	
2016	RWBY: Grimm Eclipse	Ruby Rose	
2018	BlazBlue: Cross Tag Battle	Ruby Rose	
2018	Paladins: Champions of the Realm	Ruby Rose	
2022	Freedom Planet 2	Corazon Tea	
2022	RWBY: Arrowfell	Ruby Rose	
