= Geoff Ramsey =

American internet personality (born 1975)

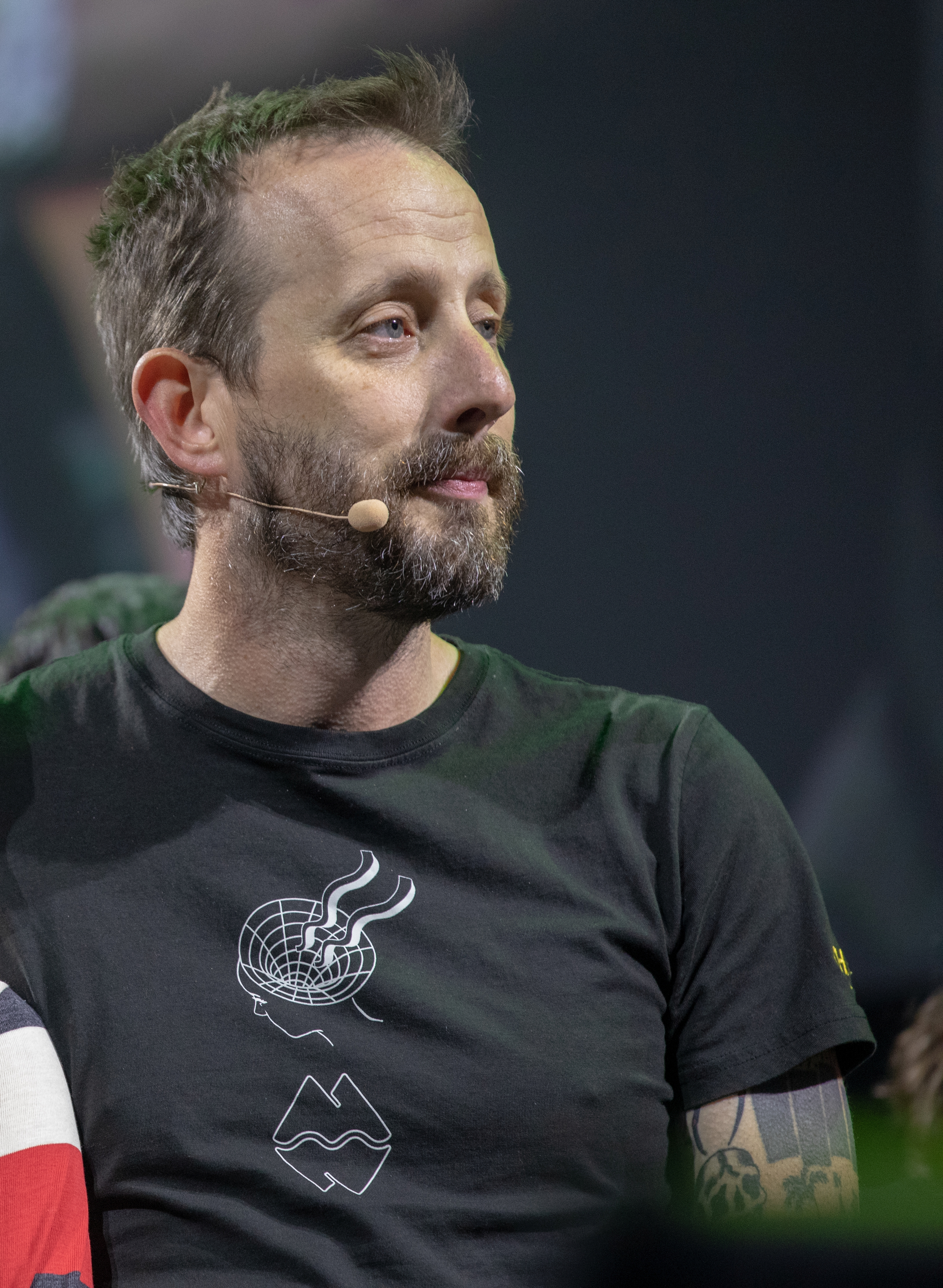
- Ramsey at RTX 2019
- Born: Geoffrey Paul Wright; June 19, 1975 (age 51); Mobile, Alabama, U.S.
- Occupations: Film producer; actor; internet personality
- Years active: 2003–present
- Employer: Rooster Teeth
- Spouses: Sarah (div. 2005); Griffon O'Connell (m. 2005; div. 2018); Emily Hatfield (m. 2023)
- Children: 1
- Website: roosterteeth.com/user/Geoff

Geoffrey Lazer Ramsey (born Geoffrey Paul Wright on June 19, 1975; later Geoffrey Paul Fink) is an American film producer, actor and internet personality. He co-founded the production company Rooster Teeth and is known for voicing Dexter Grif in the web series Red vs. Blue. He also co-founded Achievement Hunter, a now defunct gaming division of Rooster Teeth.

== Early life ==
Ramsey was born and grew up primarily in the Mobile, Alabama area, where he attended elementary and high school, but also lived in Pensacola and Jacksonville, Florida, Beaverton Oregon, and the outlying areas of New Orleans. He was a Semi-professional bowler in his teen years, and enlisted into the United States Army before graduating high school, beginning basic training at Fort Jackson in South Carolina shortly afterwards. His service lasted from 1993 to 1998, though he went on to serve as a photojournalist in Kuwait; he was based at Fort Hood during that time. He studied journalism at Fort Benjamin Harrison.

After his military service, Ramsey worked as a roadie for the band Catch 22 and as a production assistant for View Askew Productions. Ramsey then secured a job at the tech support company teleNetwork, where he met Burnie Burns and Gus Sorola. Prior to working for Rooster Teeth, he also co-created the web site drunkgamers.com with Sorola, hiring Burns shortly afterwards to run the site.

== Rooster Teeth ==
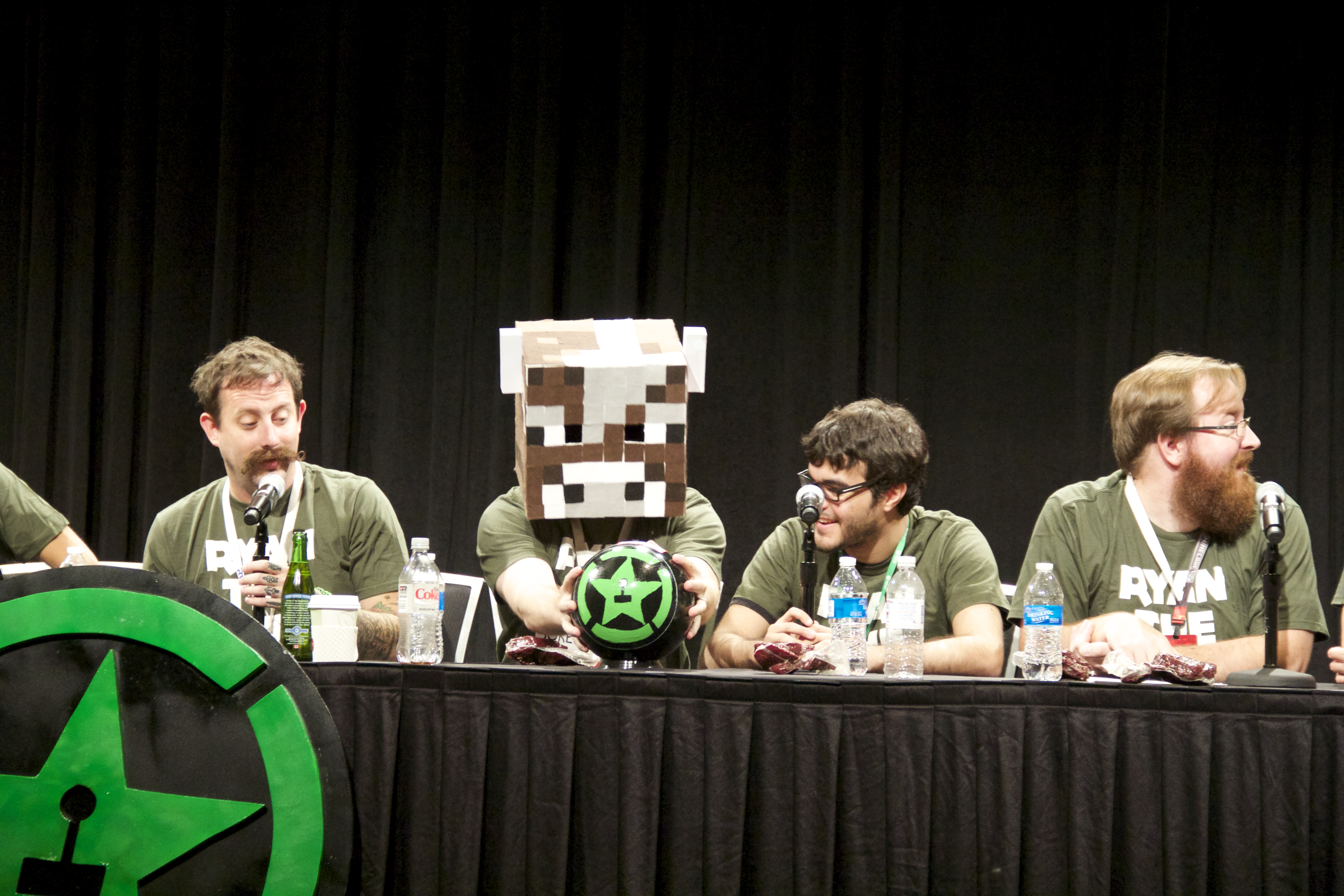
Ramsey (far left) with other members of Achievement Hunter on a panel at RTX 2014

Ramsey is one of the original voice actors for Rooster Teeth's sci-fi comedy machinima series Red vs. Blue (2003–2024) as the voice of Dexter Grif. Since then, he has gone on to become an Internet celebrity, regularly appearing at conventions such as PAX and Com Blue with Red vs. Blue actors Burnie Burns, Gus Sorola and Joel Heyman on the Rooster Teeth Podcast. He has only appeared on the podcast sporadically since September 2011, but was one of the hosts on a November 2014 episode of The Patch, Rooster Teeth's gaming podcast. Ramsey's other work with Rooster Teeth includes voicing The Omnipotent Voice in the machinima series The Strangerhood (2004–2006), playing a fictionalized version of himself in both Captain Dynamic (2008) and Rooster Teeth Shorts (2009–present), being a "lab rat" in Immersion (2010), and voicing the Corpirate, the primary antagonist of the first season of the animated series X-Ray and Vav (2014).

In 2008, Ramsey started Achievement Hunter with his colleague Jack Pattillo, a department of Rooster Teeth Productions centered largely on video games. The site originally focused on making videos of achievement guides and Easter eggs found in video games, but has since moved its primary focus to comedic "Let's Play" videos, wherein they play video games and provide humorous commentary, as well as other game-related videos and live-action content featuring the same personalities.

Additionally, he appeared in the bi-weekly reality series Happy Hour alongside his friend and coworker Gavin Free and his second wife Griffon Ramsey. In June 2018, Rooster Teeth launched its first pop-up store in Los Angeles featuring a collection of shirts, hoodies, bags, and pins designed by Ramsey. On September 23, 2019, it was announced that Ramsey had been appointed executive creative director of Rooster Teeth.

== Personal life ==
While changing his surname to his stepfather's, "Ramsey", he was informed by the court that it would not cost any more to change any of his other names, so he jokingly changed his middle name to "Lazer".

Ramsey finalized his divorce with his first wife, Sarah, on the same day as his engagement to his second wife, Griffon. He married Griffon in 2005. They have a daughter named Millicent (Millie). In November 2017, Griffon confirmed on Twitter that the two were in the process of an amicable divorce. Geoff announced the following April that he was divorced in a video on the Let's Play channel on YouTube.

Ramsey began dating an Austin-based hairstylist/salon owner, Emily Hatfield, in 2019. The couple became engaged in October 2022, and were married November 2023.

== Filmography ==
=== Film ===
Year	Title	Role	Notes
1994	Renaissance Man	Soldier	Uncredited
2015	Let's Play Live: The Documentary	Himself	Documentary
2017	The Tattooist	Himself	Documentary
2018	Blood Fest	Guns	
2018	Why We're Here: 15 Years of Rooster Teeth	Himself	Documentary
2019	Waiting for the Punchline	Himself	Documentary
2024	Red vs. Blue: Restoration	Dexter Grif	Voice; Direct-to-Video

=== Web ===
Year	Title	Role	Notes
2003–2020	Red vs. Blue	Dexter Grif (voice)	Also producer
2004–2006, 2015	The Strangerhood	Mister Mystery	Also producer
2008–2011, 2017–2024	Rooster Teeth Podcast	Himself	
2009	Captain Dynamic	Himself	Also producer
2009–2014	Rooster Teeth Shorts	Himself	
2010–2011	Immersion	Himself	
2011	O Brave New World	Himself	
2014	X-Ray and Vav	Corpirate (voice)	
2014–2016	Happy Hour	Himself	
2015–2020	Off Topic	Himself	Also producer
2016–2019	Theater Mode	Himself	Also producer
2016–2018	Heroes and Halfwits	Bo Jingles, Akshay, others	Also producer
2017	The Eleven Little Roosters	Boomerang Geoff	
2018–2020	Haunter	Himself	Also producer
2018–2019	Hardcore Tabletop	Himself	Also producer
2020	Last Laugh	Himself	Also producer
2020–2024	F**kface	Himself	
2020	Hardcore Mini Golf	Himself	
2021–2023	Annual Pass	Himself	
2023–2026	So...Alright	Himself	
2024–present	Regulation Podcast	Himself	The F**kface podcast was rebranded to the Regulation Podcast following the closure of Rooster Teeth in May 2024.

=== Video games ===
Year	Title	Role	Notes
2007	Halo 3	Additional Voices	Credited as Geoff Lazer Ramsey
2016	Worms W.M.D	Worm	
2018	Red Dead Redemption 2	Train Station Clerk	Credited as Geoff Lazer Ramsey
2019	Vicious Circle	Blitz	
