= Lazer Team 2 =

2017 film

- Official release poster
- Directed by: Daniel Fabelo; Matt Hullum
- Screenplay by: Burnie Burns; Daniel Fabelo; Matt Hullum
- Produced by: Suzanne Weinert; Doreen Copeland; Burnie Burns; Matt Hullum
- Starring: Burnie Burns; Gavin Free; Michael Jones; Colton Dunn; Nichole Sakura; Allie DeBerry
- Cinematography: Philip Roy
- Edited by: Sarah Deuel
- Music by: Carl Thiel
- Production company: Rooster Teeth
- Distributed by: Fullscreen Films; Gunpowder & Sky; YouTube Red
- Release dates: November 13, 2017 (United States); November 22, 2017 (YouTube Premium)
- Running time: 86 minutes
- Country: United States
- Language: English
- Box office: $19,996

Lazer Team 2 is a 2017 American science fiction action comedy film directed, produced and co-written by Matt Hullum and Daniel Fabelo. The film is a sequel to 2015's Lazer Team, and follows the team traveling through a wormhole to find their missing friend Woody. It was released on YouTube Red in November 2017. It received positive reviews, with critics generally considering it to be an improvement from its predecessor. Financially, it grossed less than $20,000.

== Plot ==
Four years after the events of the previous film, the D.E.T.I.A. has mostly lost its funding and nearly everyone has been let go. Lazer Team has also been disbanded, as the four heroes do not work well together, Woody being the only member to be reassigned. He, along with Dr. Maggie Whittington, has been attempting to create a rift in space, after receiving an unknown transmission. Once the rift is perfected, Woody is taken by an alien being, his helmet remaining behind. After an attempted rescue ends in a failure, Major Evelyn Kilbourne is now head of the D.E.T.I.A., and declares that any project associated with Lazer Team is to be shut down. This announcement angers Maggie, who is determined to not leave Woody lost forever. When her lab is getting cleaned out, Maggie steals a device called the translocator and sets out to find the remaining members of Lazer Team.

With the team split, Herman has capitalized on his fame in the form of marketing and commercialism; Zach owns and operates a 'lazer' hair removal business in an attempt to win back his ex-girlfriend, Mindy; Hagan has depression, as he feels his life has peaked, and he actually wants the team to form again. Maggie is able to gather the three at Hagan's house and explains the situation. While Hagan readily agrees, Herman and Zach are less than excited. The team sneaks into the base, where they're able to temporarily re-open the rift. However, Kilbourne intervenes and fights them. They all make it into the portal before it closes and Kilbourne is knocked unconscious. The four find that they're on an alien spacecraft, somewhere deep in space. Maggie also realizes that because too many people went through the rift, the translocator is out of power. Not wasting any time, they crawl through vents to avoid detection. Maggie is immediately taken by the creature that abducted Woody, and the rest of the team escape the other way. Upon exiting the vents, the three are captured and imprisoned by cloaked figures. They reveal themselves to be the Antareans. Their leader, Arklosh, still holds a grudge over Lazer Team's previous victory, so the aliens remove the Champion Armor pieces from them and, along with Woody's helmet, they disintegrate it.

The Antareans transfer them to a white prison, that is one of infinite cells containing previous champions from over the years. Before they can panic, Woody arrives and rescues them. Without his helmet, it appears that his intelligence has decreased. He takes them to a compartment in the ship, where Maggie is held. She wakes, but is upset that Woody is not the one she's known. The creature that had abducted the two reveals himself. Woody introduces him as Doulos, the keeper of the 'Galactic Games' and the only remaining of the Ludon species, who has been enslaved on the ship for many years. He explains that when the team defeated the Antareans, it caused said aliens to wipe out planet after planet, afraid that more champions would rise and rebel against them. Revealing that he brought the team back together to finish what they've started, he leads the five to a control center where an experimental upgraded suit of power resides. The team is unwilling and Doulos urges the team to put on the pieces, however he is killed by Kilbourne before he can convince them. She reveals that she is the sister of the previous champion, Adam, and is now working with the Antareans, as she's always been jealous. Once the team is in a holding cell, she prepares to receive the pieces to destroy Earth.

When the ship finally arrives to Earth, the team realize their wrongdoings with not helping Doulos. They kill two guards before sneaking back to the control center. A battle ensues and Lazer Team acquires the upgraded armor. Back on Earth, Officer Vandenbloom notices many Antarean ships heading for the planet. With the help of Mindy and 'Mr. Scientist', he is able to fend off the majority of the ships using a turret designed by the D.E.T.I.A. Back on the ship, the five are able to kill Kilbourne, with the help of another champion Woody had let out, and grab the translocator. They board a small ship, and using the device, are able to destroy the Antarean mother-ship and return home.

With the Earth saved once again, the team keeps contact with one another. Having a picnic, Woody and Maggie reveal their feelings for each other. They discover a small button on his helmet that shrinks it, and the two kiss.

== Cast ==
- Burnie Burns as Anthony Hagan, a former traffic cop and a member of Lazer Team. Hagan wears the left arm of the suit, allowing him to generate an energy shield.
- Gavin Free as Woodrow "Woody" Johnson, a member of Lazer Team. Woody wears the helmet of the suit, heightening his intelligence and granting him other enhancements such as X-ray vision.
- Michael Jones as Zachary "Zach" Spencer, a former six year High School senior and a member of Lazer Team. Zach wears the right arm of the suit, which is an energy cannon.
- Colton Dunn as Herman Mendoza, a former football athlete (who played on a team with Hagan) and a member of Lazer Team. Herman wears the boots of the suit, which let him run at superhuman speeds.
- Nichole Sakura as Maggie Wittington, a scientist who gets Lazer Team to help her find Woody after he disappears into a wormhole.
- Victoria Pratt as Major Evelyn Kilbourne, who strongly opposes Dr. Whittington's plans.
- Gus Sorola as 'Mr. Scientist' aka the disheveled scientist from the first film.
- Alexandria DeBerry as Mindy Hagan, Anthony Hagan's daughter and Zach's ex-girlfriend.
- Kirk Johnson as Officer Vandenbloom
- Ashley Jenkins as RTN News Anchor
- Joel Heyman as Reporter #1
- Barbara Dunkelman as Reporter #2
- A. Smith Harrison as TV Announcer
- Bryon Brown as Commercial Director
- Jack Lee as Channing Rosegood
- Lawrence Sonntag as Max
- Greg Miller as Ralph
- Matt Hullum as Voice of Arklosh
- Hailley Lauren as Doulos
- Danu Uribe as Receptionist and Voice of Doulos
- Tyler Coe as "Football" Player

== Production ==
On August 5, 2016, Burnie Burns and Gavin Free announced that a sequel to Lazer Team was green-lit by Rooster Teeth in partnership with YouTube Red and they had officially begun pre-production on the film. In December 2016, Matt Hullum confirmed Rooster Teeth was aiming to shoot Lazer Team 2 in late Spring in Texas followed by release in 2017. On August 25, 2017, it was confirmed that the film was written by Burns, Hullum, and Fabelo.

Shooting was completed in only half as many days, 20, as the first film. In April 2017, filming for the sequel concluded. On October 12, 2017, Rooster Teeth released the trailer for the sequel that revealed the film's release date to be November 13, 2017 in theaters and November 22, 2017 on YouTube Red.
