= Michael Jones (actor) =

American actor (born 1987)

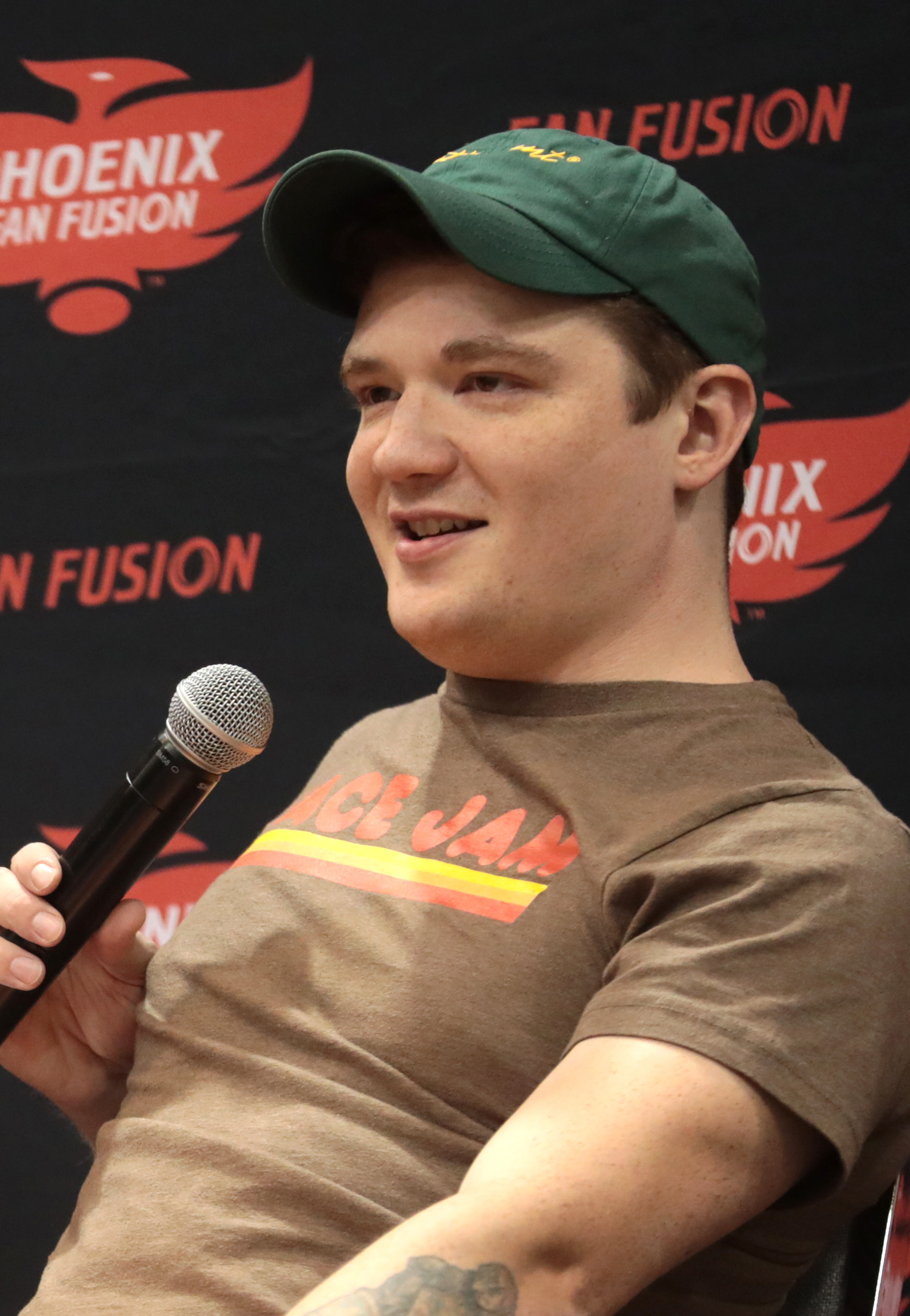
- Michael Jones speaking at the 2022 Phoenix Fan Fusion in Phoenix, Arizona.
- Born: Michael Vincent Jones; July 24, 1987 (age 39); Woodbridge Township, New Jersey, U.S.
- Occupations: Actor; YouTube personality; Podcaster
- Years active: 2009–present
- Known for: Achievement Hunter; Camp Camp; Rage Quit; Internet Box; Lazer Team; Lazer Team 2; Off Topic; Face Jam
- Spouse: Lindsay Jones (m. 2014)
- Children: 2

Michael Vincent Jones (born July 24, 1987) is an American actor, podcast host and internet personality who is known for his work with Rooster Teeth's gameplay division Achievement Hunter. He also co-hosted three-time Podcast Award winner Internet Box.

Jones had worked extensively with Rooster Teeth, having also starred in the second and third seasons of Immersion, the comedy murder mystery series Ten Little Roosters, and voices the character Sun Wukong in Rooster Teeth's RWBY, and Max in the first four seasons of Camp Camp. He starred in Rooster Teeth's science fiction action comedy film Lazer Team, released in 2016, as well as its sequel the following year.

His work outside of Rooster Teeth includes voicing Sting Eucliffe in Fairy Tail, Dogra in One Piece, Rapture in Ninja Slayer From Animation, and Gen in World Break: Aria of Curse for a Holy Swordsman.

== Career ==
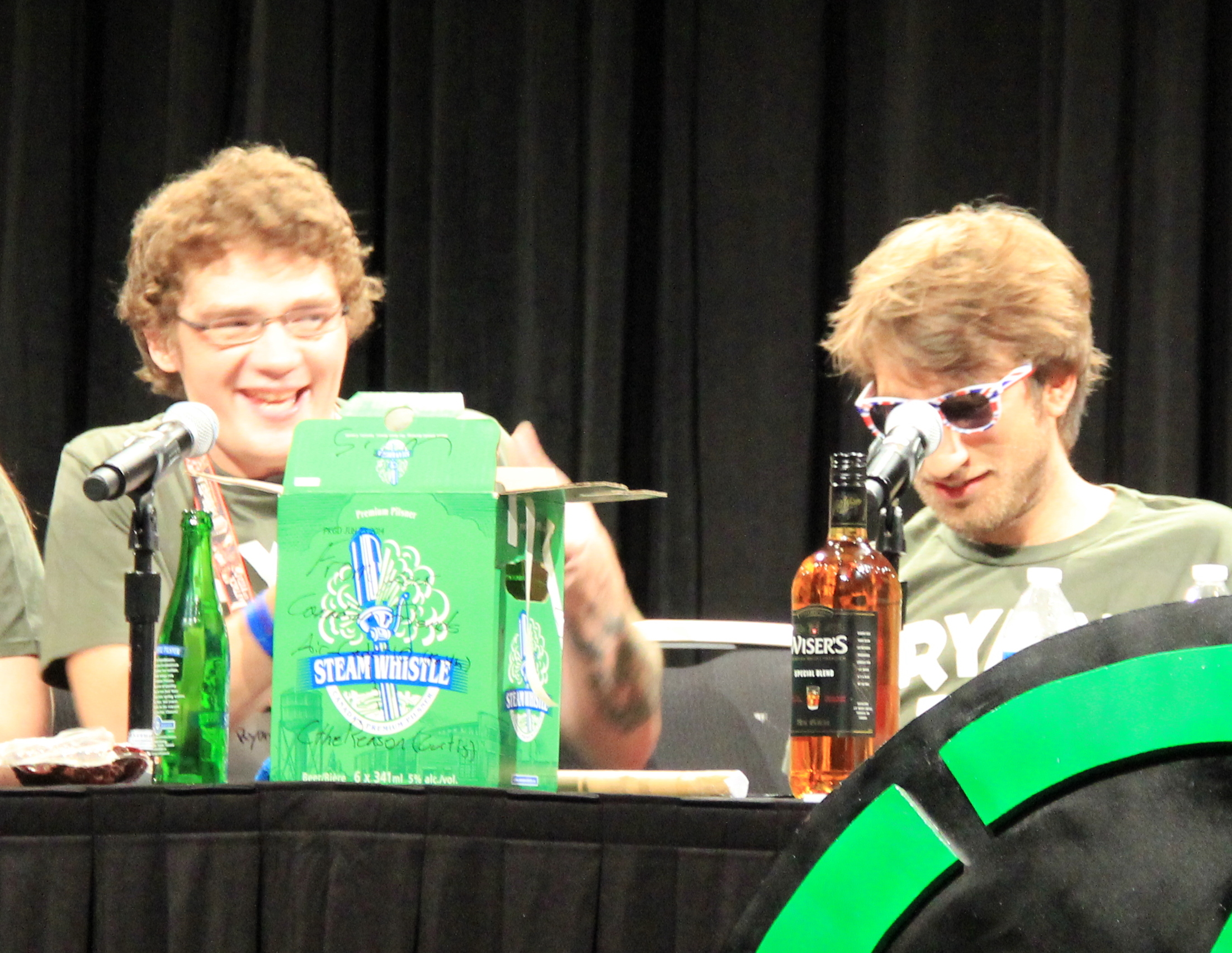
Michael Jones and Gavin Free on the Achievement Hunter panel at RTX 2014

After graduating from high school, Jones worked as an electrician for almost five years. Jones first came to attention after his video "Crackdown 2 – Orbs = Bullshit" reached the front page of reddit. He received an email from Rooster Teeth asking him to join and make a new show for Achievement Hunter, which became Rage Quit. In September 2011, he co-founded the Internet Box podcast hosted by himself, Barbara Dunkelman, Ray Narvaez, Jr., Andrew Blanchard, Mike Kroon, and Dylan "Dylon" Saramago, with Lindsay Jones and Kerry Shawcross being added to the cast later on. He is an occasional guest on the Rooster Teeth Podcast and was the main host of the Achievement Hunter podcast Off Topic and co-host of Face Jam along with Jordan Cwierz. In 2022 Jones participated in State Farm’s The Gamerhood Challenge.

Jones has worked as both an actor and a voice artist in multiple projects, several of which are produced by Rooster Teeth. For Rooster Teeth's animated productions, he has voiced Sun Wukong in RWBY, lead character Max in Camp Camp, and Mogar in X-Ray and Vav. He has also portrayed live-action fictionalized versions of himself in both Rooster Teeth Shorts and Ten Little Roosters, as well as Zach in the sci-fi comedy film Lazer Team and Lazer Team 2. He has co-starred in the Rooster Teeth series Immersion since season two. His non-Rooster Teeth credits include the animated shows Fairy Tail, as Sting Eucliffe, and World Break: Aria of Curse for a Holy Swordsman, as Gen. On October 1, 2016, Jones announced via Twitter that he will be playing Dogra in One Piece.

The creator of the video game Surgeon Simulator named the alien character Gworb after a remark made by Jones in a Let's Play video in which Jones was conversing with Gavin Free. In addition Gworb has an organ known as the "Gavichal", which is a combination of Michael Jones' and Gavin Free's names.

== Personal life ==
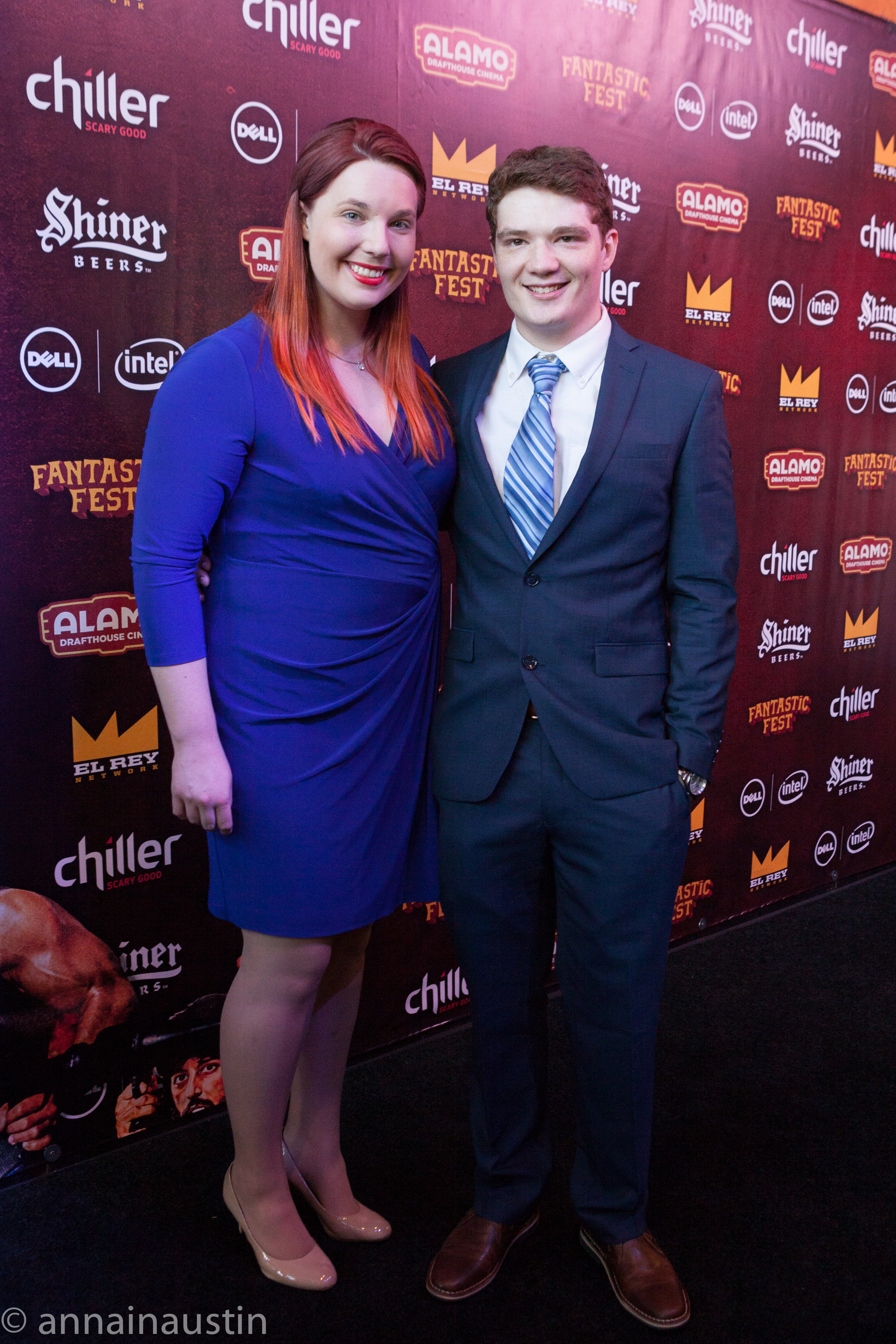
Michael and his spouse Lindsay Jones

Jones was born in Woodbridge, New Jersey to "devout Roman Catholic parents."

Jones has maintained a longtime close friendship with fellow Achievement Hunter, Gavin Free, since the pair met in 2012. Free was a groomsman in Jones’ wedding.

On May 9, 2014, Jones married his long-time romantic partner and Rooster Teeth voice actor Lindsay Tuggey. During Rooster Teeth's 2016 Extra Life livestream, the couple announced that they are expecting a child, which was later revealed to be a girl in January 2017. They announced the birth of their first daughter, born May 24, 2017. On August 5, 2018, Jones announced at RTX 2018 that he and Lindsay were expecting their second child in February 2019. Their second daughter was born February 18, 2019.

== Filmography ==
=== Film ===
Year	Title	Role	Notes
2016	Lazer Team	Zach	Feature film
2017	Lazer Team 2	Zach	Feature film

=== Television ===
Year	Title	Role	Notes
2014–2019	Fairy Tail	Sting Eucliffe	Television series; English version
2015	World Break: Aria of Curse for a Holy Swordsman	Gen	Television series; English version
2015	Dragonar Academy	Additional Cast	Television series; English version
2015	Ninja Slayer From Animation	Rapture	Television series; English version
2016	One Piece	Dogra	Television series; English version
2016	Dagashi Kashi	Additional Cast	Television series: English version
2018	Overlord	Hekkeran Termite	Television series; English version

=== Web ===
Year	Title	Role	Notes
2011–2014, 2016	Internet Box	Himself	Podcast
2011–2014	Red vs. Blue	Ground Soldier #2, Chain Guy, Private Ghanoush (voices)	Web series
2011–2017	Rage Quit	Himself	Web series
2011–2017	Rooster Teeth Shorts	Himself	Web series
2012	Nature Town	Cancer the Rabbit (Episode: "Tortoise and the Rare Disease")	Web series
2013–present	Immersion	Himself	Web series
2013–present	RWBY	Sun Wukong	Web series
2014–present	Play Pals	Himself	Web series
2014	Ten Little Roosters	Himself	Web series; one episode
2015	YouTubers React	Himself	Web series
2015	Let's Play Live: The Documentary	Himself	Documentary
2015	Tom & Bill	Additional Voices	Web Series; one episode
2015	X-Ray and Vav	Mogar	Web series
2015–2023	Off Topic	Host	Podcast
2016–2018; 2021	RWBY Chibi	Sun Wukong	Web series
2016–2019	Camp Camp	Max	Web series; (Season 1-4)
2016–present	Heroes and Halfwits	Mogar Jones / Himself	Web series
2017	The Eleven Little Roosters	Operator Mikey	Web Series
2019–2024	Face Jam	Himself	Podcast
2020	Transformers: War for Cybertron Trilogy	Thrust	Netflix
2022	RWBY: Ice Queendom	Sun Wukong	Streaming exclusive English dub of television series
2023–2024	RWBY-Vtubing	Sun Wukong	Web Series; guest
2023	Stinky Dragon Adventures	Rat King	Web series - one Episode
2024	RWBY Beyond	Sun Wukong	Web series - one Episode
2024–present	100% Eat	Himself	Podcast

=== Video games ===
Year	Title	Voice role	Notes
2013	LocoCycle	Nicaragua Cocktail Partier	
2016	Worms W.M.D	Worm voices	
2019	Vicious Circle	Burn	
