= Ten Little Roosters =

- Genre: Comedy, Mystery
- Created by: Josh Flanagan
- Starring: Burnie Burns; Chris Demarais; Barbara Dunkelman; Adam Ellis; Gavin Free; Ryan Haywood; Lindsay Jones; Michael Jones; Miles Luna; Gus Sorola
- Country of origin: United States
- Original language: English
- No. of episodes: 8

Production
- Producers: Burnie Burns; Matt Hullum
- Production location: Austin, Texas
- Running time: 5–10 minutes
- Production company: Rooster Teeth

Original release
- Network: Rooster Teeth
- Release: November 4 – December 23, 2014

Related
- The Eleven Little Roosters

Ten Little Roosters is an American comedy mystery web series created, directed and written by Josh Flanagan. It premiered on Rooster Teeth's website on November 4, 2014, with a total of 8 episodes. Each episode is uploaded to Rooster Teeth's YouTube channel a day after its release on the Rooster Teeth website. The show featured an interactive murder mystery component and is inspired by Agatha Christie's And Then There Were None. A semi-sequel series, The Eleven Little Roosters, debuted on January 16, 2017.

== Format ==
Creator Josh Flanagan described the series as a "proof of concept" for different, interactive experiences that can be offered by a web series. The series is inspired by Agatha Christie's 1939 novel And Then There Were None. Viewers vote on who they think the murderer is, who they think will die, and how that person will meet their end. Correct guesses were entered for a chance to win Rooster Teeth merchandise, and the fan with the most correct answers upon the completion of the show will win a trip to the Rooster Teeth studios or to a convention of his or her choice.

One party guest is murdered each episode. Both the novel and the series involve the party of ten people being murdered one by one by a mysterious killer, their deaths foreshadowed in the form of a poem. However, the show has a much more comedic tone than the novel. Much of the humour is derived from knowledge of Rooster Teeth itself. For example, characters wear wardrobe from their previous productions (Demarais dons his hobbit costume from A Simple Walk Into Mordor while Haywood wears a kilt akin to his Minecraft avatar). In addition, the story is different so that people familiar with the source material are unable to guess the outcome.

The victim dies within the last few minutes of the episode, their death often being the last few shots. The episode ends with a portrait of the murder victim hanging on a wall and a plaque below the portrait with the specific verse of the poem foreshadowing that character's death.

== Plot ==
The series opens at Rooster Teeth's first company banquet hosted by Burnie Burns for nine of his employees: Chris Demarais, Barbara Dunkelman, Adam Ellis, Gavin Free, Ryan Haywood, Lindsay Jones, Michael Jones, Miles Luna and Gus Sorola. The guests stumble upon a poem entitled Ten Little Roosters, written in the style of the original Ten Little Indians poem. As the evening goes on it becomes clear that the verses of the poem are outlining the murders of several guests over the course of the night, and the guests have no choice but to try to survive locked in with a cold-blooded murderer.

== Episodes ==
No.	Title	Directed by	Written by	Original release date
1	"And Then There were Nine"	Josh Flanagan	Josh Flanagan	November 4, 2014
Burnie Burns hosts the first official Rooster Teeth company banquet. Michael stands and asks the guests to look under their seats, where they find an envelope. Within each envelope is an incriminating photo accusing the guests of killing someone they knew. Michael pulls out a gun and reveals that one of the party guests is a cold-blooded murderer. However, after taking a drink from his wine glass, Michael begins coughing uncontrollably and drops to the floor, poisoned from his drink. The guests begin accusing one another of the murder, making the decision to leave the building. However, the doors have been locked. Burnie finds a poem taped to a door, and deduces that it is foreshadowing the murders of the rest of the guests.
2	"And Then There Were Eight"	Josh Flanagan	Josh Flanagan	November 11, 2014
Burnie reveals to Ryan that he is an undercover cop. He hosted the party in order to catch the killer who was responsible for the death of his partner. Lindsay encounters Barbara panicking and standing on a chair because some of the poisonous animals in Joel Heyman's office have escaped. Miles is wandering around the office, trying to convince himself that he can survive the night, but he almost stumbles onto a floor covered in mousetraps. Chris encounters the masked killer, who is wielding gasoline and fire. However, Chris mistakes this threat for the killer wanting to play a game of riddles, which he happily accepts. Eventually, the killer wanders off and leaves Chris sobbing in the corridor. Gavin's clone encounters Adam with his beard trapped in a door. After gaining the clone's confidence, Adam mentions that he has a bow and arrow in his office and that he plans to go after the killer. He and the clone make their way to the office to grab the weapon. However, the clone ends up running into the real Gavin, and they both trip and fall into the floor full of mousetraps, killing them both.
3	"And Then There Were Seven"	Josh Flanagan	Josh Flanagan	November 18, 2014
Lindsay notices Adam sitting in the control room, his beard caught in a microphone. Adam mentions that the killer has cut the internet in the building and stolen his cellphone. Lindsay mentions that she's also missing some stuff from her office, namely her Ruby Rose costume. Immediately afterwards, Miles is seen wearing the costume, and he makes his way to the recording studio in hopes of getting internet access while singing the theme song of RWBY. He is startled by Ryan, who is standing within the sound booth. Ryan mentions that the Gavins have died, as well as expressing his concerns that he might have been responsible for their murders as well as Michael's, saying that he's wished them dead so often in the past. Barbara is seen entering her office to grab her 'lucky bowling pin', only to find Gus in the office. Chris runs into Burnie after his encounter with the killer and attempts to explain what he saw, but his ramblings about riddles makes Burnie think that Chris hasn't actually seen the killer and is just thinking about The Lord of the Rings. The killer arrives and shoots Chris multiple times with a bow and arrow, killing him.
4	"And Then There Were Six"	Josh Flanagan	Josh Flanagan	November 28, 2014
Barbara finds Adam with his beard trapped in a gate. After freeing him, Barbara suggests teaming up, but he refuses on account of the fate of the Gavins. Lindsay is revealed to have taken Adam's advice to heart about hiding, however it is revealed that she is simply using the green screen in the office to 'hide' in different locations such as the sea, in space and in a forest. Ryan is found in front of mirror, having become increasingly paranoid and trying to convince himself that he wasn't responsible for the murders of Michael and the Gavins. Miles enters Gus' office, hoping that Gus' computer can access the internet. Gus is more interested in showing Miles his poetry that he has been working on throughout the night. After Miles calls his poetry bad, Gus angrily pushes him away and Miles goes off to try to find another internet source. Meanwhile, Burnie puts on some riot gear and prepares to take on the killer himself, but as he reaches for a weapon, he gets stung by one of Joel's scorpions, which poisons and kills him.
5	"And Then There Were Five"	Josh Flanagan	Josh Flanagan	December 2, 2014
Ryan wakes up after collapsing, only to realize that he has been trapped a in a room in the ground. Ryan asks for Barbara's help in escaping, but she is unsuccessful in doing so, annoying Ryan. After he accuses Barbara of being the killer and trapping him in the room, an offended Barbara abandons Ryan to try to find an axe to break him out. Gus is still writing his poetry in his office, with scenes of his poetry-writing interspersed with Lindsay's attempts to hide in another office. Adam has now changed into a MoCap suit in an attempt to blend in and has obtained some headphones in an attempt to 'make things less scary' by blocking out scary noises. Adam begins snarking about Miles' outfit, but it is brushed off as Miles remembers that Monty Oum has an emergency beacon hidden in his office to call the police. Gus then hears a knock at the door, which he opens and is killed by the killer with a pitchfork.
6	"And Then There Were Four"	Josh Flanagan	Josh Flanagan	December 9, 2014
Lindsay does a fake broadcast of The Know in a desperate attempt to get some outside attention of the situation. Barbara wanders in and discovers that Ryan is still trapped in the underground chamber. She leaves to go and find an axe to help him escape. Ryan is slowly running out of oxygen and is trying to distract himself from his imminent death. He escapes from the hole by breaking the glass himself. Adam is shown to be trying to blend into the walls of the Motion Capture area, as Miles uses Monty's computer to try to find his emergency beacon. The killer then appears and strangles Adam to death with a computer mouse.
7	"And Then There Were Three"	Josh Flanagan	Josh Flanagan	December 16, 2014
The episode opens with an 'In Memoriam' montage accompanied by Barbara playing 'Taps' on her cats piano. As Barbara leaves, she accidentally triggers a tripwire which releases the puma from its cage. The puma pursues all of the guests in turn, starting with Miles who hides behind a gate to escape the puma. Barbara is then chased by the puma but she is able to fend it off by playing her cat piano. Afterwards, the puma chases after Ryan and manages to back him into a wall. Seeing this, Lindsay says that she can speak 'Puma' and distracts it to let Ryan escape. However, Lindsay gets herself mauled and killed by the puma.
8	"And Then There Were Two & One"	Josh Flanagan	Josh Flanagan	December 23, 2014
Ryan wakes up on the podcast set with his wrists tied after escaping the puma. Sitting across from him is Barbara in a green suit, revealing herself as the murderer. She then shows a camera feed of Miles who is trapped in another room, getting killed due to exhaustion from a treadmill. Barbara reveals that she believes herself to have moved onto a greater plane of existence, and has killed off the other Rooster Teeth employees as they are not 'worthy' of her anymore. She also reveals her plan to frame Ryan for the murders, taking advantage of his reputation as a 'virtual sociopath' and using his GTA V outfit as a disguise whilst committing the murders, in the hopes that the police will link the murders with the poem and that she will escape scot-free. However, Ryan escapes and after a brief fight with Barbara he reveals that the outfit she's wearing isn't just a green costume but is actually Gavin's 100% accurate Minecraft Creeper suit which is rigged with explosives. Ryan activates the suit, killing Barbara. A blood-spattered Ryan opens the entrance to the studio, puts on a king's crown and leaves behind the evening of murder as the sole survivor.
