= Matt Hullum =

American film director

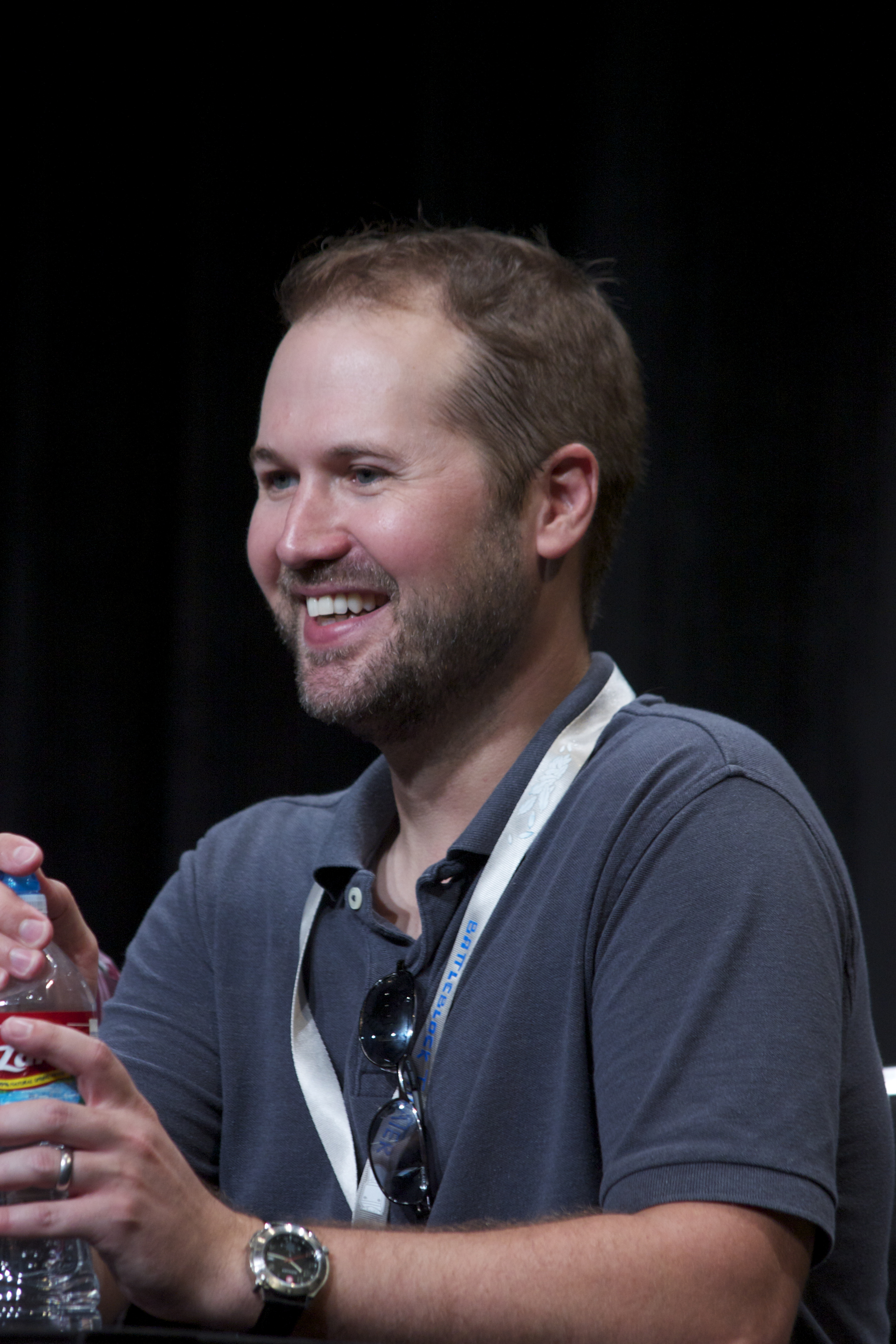
- Matt Hullum at RTX 2013
- Born: Matthew Jay Hullum; September 29, 1974 (age 51); Atlanta, Georgia, U.S.
- Education: University of Texas at Austin (BS)
- Occupation: (Former) Chief Content Officer of Rooster Teeth
- Years active: 1997–present
- Spouse: Anna Hurayt (m. 2000)
- Children: 2
- Website: roosterteeth.com/Matt

Matthew Jay Hullum (born September 29, 1974) is an American film director, producer, writer, actor, and visual effects supervisor living in Austin, Texas. He was one of five co-founders and former CEO of production company Rooster Teeth, which specialized in online content, including live-action series, podcasts, animation and machinima, an art using game engines to create films.

Alongside longtime business partner Burnie Burns, he was named one of Variety's top Digital Entertainment Execs to Watch in 2018.

== Early life ==
Matthew Jay Hullum was born in Atlanta, Georgia on September 29, 1974, to librarian Cheri Johnston (born 1945) and sports journalist and freelance writer Everett Hullum (1942–2015).

== Career ==
Hullum met his production partner Burnie Burns while working at TSTV at the University of Texas at Austin. He recalled loving the creative freedom due to the lack of "gatekeepers" at the station. He would graduate with a Bachelor of Science in film.

Alongside Burns, he would direct, write and produce their directorial debut The Schedule (1997), starring his roommate Joel Heyman. He would go on to work as the visual effects coordinator for Hollywood films such as The Faculty and Driven.

Hullum voices Sarge in the Rooster Teeth original series Red vs. Blue, of which he also directs, produces and serves as casting director. He directed the science fiction comedy film Lazer Team, the first feature-length film Hullum has directed in over 18 years. Hullum co-wrote the film alongside Burnie Burns, Chris Demarais, and Josh Flanagan.

Hullum has directed four music videos for singles by the Barenaked Ladies, "Odds Are", "Did I Say That Out Loud?", "Say What You Want" and "Lookin' Up". In 2023, it was announced that Hullum would return as director for Red vs. Blue's final season, with Burns also returning as writer.

== Personal life ==
Hullum married lawyer and actress Anna Hurayt on August 26, 2000. They live in Austin, Texas with their two children.

== Filmography ==
=== Film ===
Year	Title	Roles	Notes
1997	The Schedule	—N/a	Co-director, co-writer and producer
1998	The Faculty	—N/a	Visual effects coordinator
2001	Driven	—N/a	Visual effects producer
2002	Scooby-Doo	—N/a	Visual effects production manager
2003	Gods and Generals	—N/a	Visual effects producer
2004	Clifford's Really Big Movie	—N/a	Digital supervisor
2005	Babak & Friends: A First Norooz	—N/a	Producer and editor
2015	Lazer Team	Army Soldier	Also director, co-writer and producer
2017	Lazer Team 2	Arklosh (voice)	Also director, co-writer and producer
2018	Blood Fest	—N/a	Executive producer
2019	A Heist With Markiplier	—N/a	Executive producer
2024	Red vs. Blue Restoration	Sarge, Doc, Omega, Additional Voices (voices)	Also director and executive producer

=== Television ===
Year	Title	Role	Notes
2007	Code Monkeys	Red Guard (voice)	Episode: "Super Prison Breakout"
2019	Gen:Lock	Marc Holfcroft (voice)	Also executive producer

=== Web ===
Year	Title	Role	Notes
2003–2020	Red vs. Blue	Sarge, Doc, O'Malley, Wyoming, The Meta (voices)	Also director, writer, producer and editor
2004–2006, 2015	The Strangerhood	Dutchmiller (voice)	Also director, writer, producer and editor
2009	Rooster Teeth Shorts	Himself	Also co-director, co-writer, producer and cinematographer
2012–2013	The Gauntlet	—N/a	Executive producer
2013–present	RWBY	—N/a	Executive producer
2014	iBlade	Ted	Also second unit director
2014	Ten Little Roosters	—N/a	Executive producer
2014–2015	X-Ray and Vav	—N/a	Executive producer
2016–2018; 2021	RWBY Chibi	—N/a	Executive producer
2016–2024	Camp Camp	Lt. Stuart Huston (voice)	Episode: "Parents' Day"; also executive producer
2016	Crunch Time	Nursing Instructor	Episode: "The Moruga"
2016; 2020-2021	Death Battle	Sarge, Meta (voice)	Episodes: Meta VS Carolina, Red VS Blue, Macho Man VS Kool-Aid Man
2016	The Eleven Little Roosters	The Big Cock	
2017	Day 5	Dale	Also executive producer
2018	Nomad of Nowhere	Bertha (voice)	Also producer

=== Video games ===
Year	Title	Role
2007	Halo 3	Additional Voices

=== Music videos ===
Year	Title	Artist	Notes
2013	"Odds Are"	Barenaked Ladies	Director
2014	"Did I Say That Out Loud?"	Barenaked Ladies	Director
2015	"Say What You Want"	Barenaked Ladies	Director
