= Achievement Hunter =

Entertainment company (2008–2023)

- Type: Division
- Industry: Entertainment
- Genre: Comedy gaming, Let's Plays, game walkthroughs
- Founded: July 6, 2008; 18 years ago
- Founders: Geoff Ramsey; Jack Pattillo
- Defunct: October 1, 2023
- Fate: Dissolved
- Successor: Dogbark; F**kface (Let's Play) (Note: F**kface took over the Let's Play series and channel after Achievement Hunter ended until Rooster Teeth's closure in May 2024.)
- Headquarters: Austin, Texas, United States
- Key people: Geoff Ramsey (manager, 2008–16); Lindsay Jones (supervising producer, 2016–17); Trevor Collins (supervising producer, 2017–21); Sarah Weems (supervising producer, 2021–23); Jarren Martinez (channel manager, 2023)
- Services: Online video; Community website
- Parent: Rooster Teeth
- Website: Official website

Achievement Hunter was an American video gaming division of Rooster Teeth Productions. Founded by Geoff Ramsey and Jack Pattillo on July 6, 2008, the website was originally based on the achievement mechanic in video games but grew to become a core component of Rooster Teeth, hosting a wide variety of videos related to video games.

Achievement Hunter dissolved after publishing its final video on October 1, 2023. All members moved elsewhere within Rooster Teeth, which itself ceased operations in May 2024.

== History and development ==
=== 2008–2010: Inception ===
In 2008, Geoff Ramsey's interest in gaming achievements resulted in the realization that no community-based website related to achievements existed. Since Ramsey and Burnie Burns, then Rooster Teeth CEO, were both "huge achievement fans" and dueling each other to get the most achievements in their spare time, Ramsey had an idea to begin developing a website where gamers and fans could look up information on how to get specific achievements. Ramsey approached Burns about creating a website based on achievements; Burns agreed, and Ramsey created Achievement Hunter, which shares a similar design to the main Rooster Teeth website. Ramsey later elaborated, saying he had grown tired of making Red vs. Blue and enjoyed working on this new, creative outlet in his spare time. Alongside employee Jack Pattillo, Ramsey regularly released achievement guides and Easter egg videos, often receiving assistance from select volunteers from the Rooster Teeth community. David Dreger also assisted in the founding of the site.

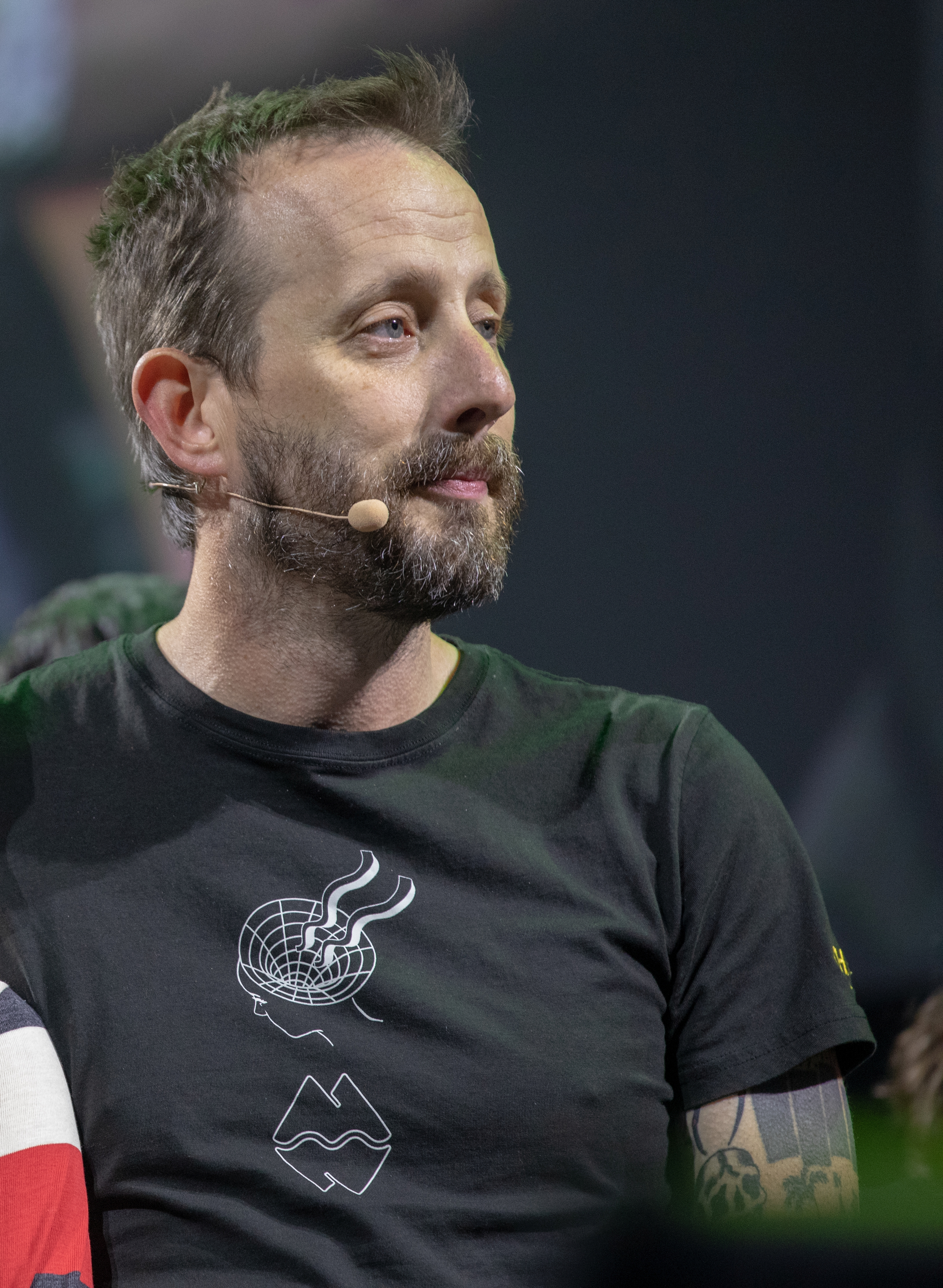
Geoff Ramsey's interest in gaming achievements led to the creation of Achievement Hunter.

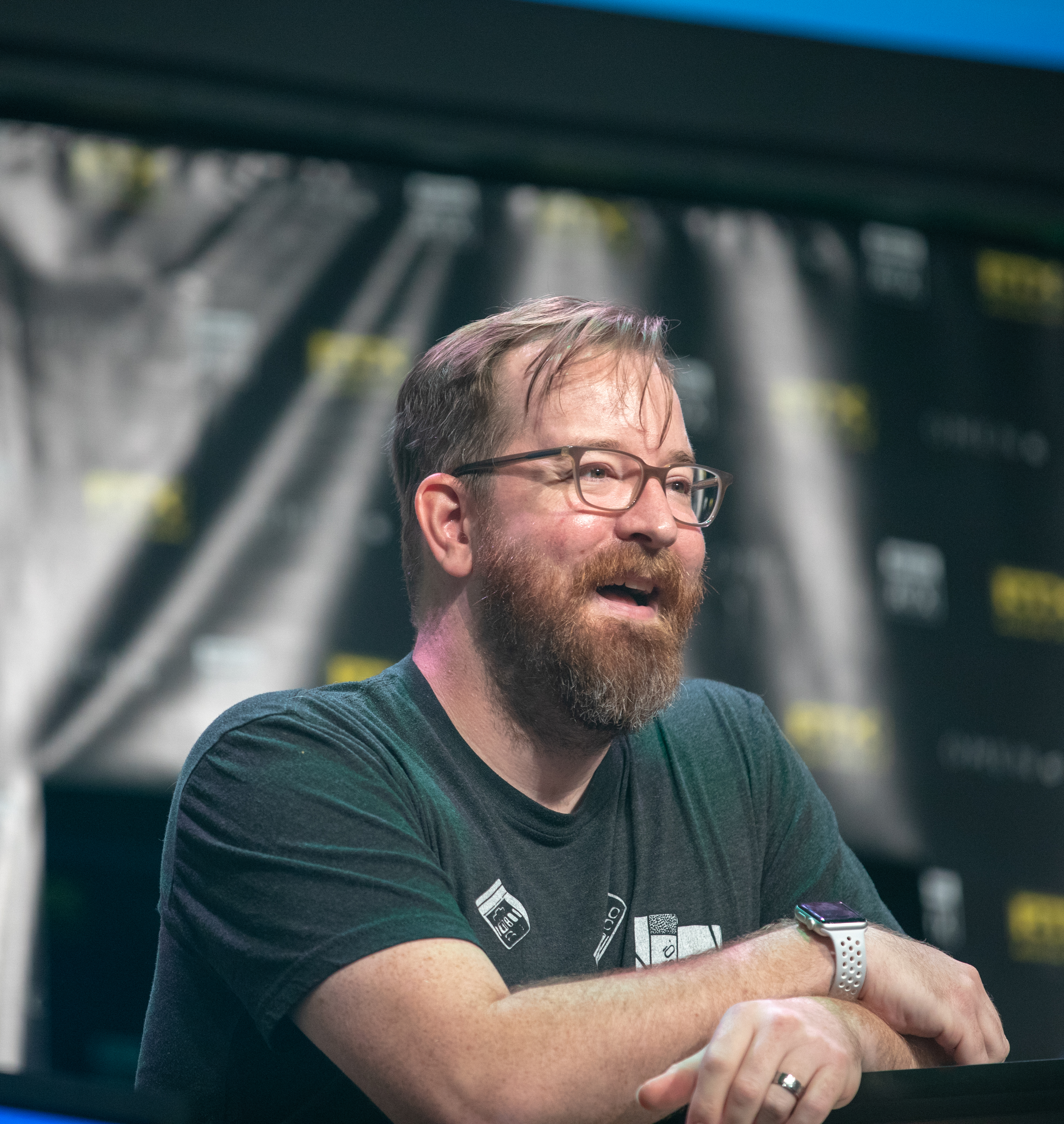
Shortly following his employment at Rooster Teeth, Jack Pattillo largely assisted Ramsey in the founding of Achievement Hunter.

=== 2011–2012: Employment growth ===
In 2011, Achievement Hunter hired Ryan Haywood as an editor and manager; Haywood later began being featured in videos as a host in March 2012, becoming one of the main crew members. Four new shows were introduced to Achievement Hunter in 2011. One of them, Rage Quit, led to the official hiring of Michael Jones as a full-time staff member in August 2011.

In December 2011, Achievement Hunter also began creating Let's Play videos. The success of the videos resulted in a weekly sub-series in 2012, in which the main hosts play Minecraft. Weekly Let's Play videos focusing on Grand Theft Auto games are also released. Let's Play Grand Theft Auto was typically released on Mondays and Let's Play Minecraft on Fridays.

Achievement Hunter hired Gavin Free in 2012, after he had assisted with the company for many years. In March 2012, Achievement Hunter debuted Game Night, in which Ramsey and Caleb Denecour play games with community members; the series switched to a live stream format in 2014. Community member Ray Narvaez Jr. was hired in April 2012, having worked as a contract host for multiple years. Later, in September 2012, contract editor Franco Scarcello created Five Facts, which was generally hosted by Pattillo and Ramsey and focused on little-known facts about various video games; it was not renewed for a sixth season in May 2016.

=== 2013–2015: Popularization and the Let's Play Network ===
In early 2013, Achievement Hunter introduced a competition series titled VS, in which the employees challenge each other to compete in games. In April 2013, Achievement Hunter launched their own channel on YouTube, which hosts a variety of their videos. Later in 2013, the company retired Achievement HORSE, replacing it with Achievement HUNT, in which a variety of employees challenge each other until the word "HUNT" has been spelled.

In October 2013, Pattillo hosted a 24-hour live stream for Extra Life, a charity benefiting hospitalized children. With appearances from other Achievement Hunter members and various Rooster Teeth employees, the live stream raised $340,000. This charity live stream has become an annual event, with 2014's Extra Life live stream raising over $442,000 for Children's Miracle Network. At RTX in July 2014, community members Matt Bragg and Jeremy Dooley were hired as editors and secondary hosts at Achievement Hunter.

On February 5, 2015, Achievement Hunter officially founded the Let's Play Network YouTube channel. The channel acted as a platform for multiple Rooster Teeth owned and affiliated groups and divisions to upload gameplays. Some of these groups included the likes of Funhaus, ScrewAttack, Cow Chop, Kinda Funny, and Sugar Pine 7. Although, a majority of the channel's videos still consisted of Achievement Hunter's content.

In early 2015, Achievement Hunter hosted the first Let's Play Live at the Moody Theater in Austin, Texas. In April 2015, Narvaez departed from the company as a full-time employee to focus on Twitch live-streaming, although he continued to voice his character for the company's X-Ray and Vav animated series until its eventual cancellation. In mid-2015, Achievement Hunter launched a new YouTube channel, named after themselves, where they upload series of videos that were previously uploaded to the Rooster Teeth channel. Additionally, they moved out of Rooster Teeth's Stage 5, Austin Studios office into their own office nearby.

Dooley was promoted to a main host in October 2015, during an episode of Let's Play Minecraft. A weekly podcast titled Off Topic was announced in early October, hosted by Michael Jones. Four test episodes aired live and were only available to "First Members" on their website. The first official episode aired to the public after the initial tests. Jones serves as the main host of the show and makes the most frequent appearances alongside other Achievement Hunter employees and special guests, including Patricia Summersett, Arin Hanson, Chef Mike Haracz and Samm Levine. He also hosts the after show Last Call available for First Members only.

Starting in 2015, Achievement Hunter occasionally featured celebrities as guest collaborators in some of their Let's Play videos, including Watsky, Rahul Kohli from iZombie, Dan Campbell from The Wonder Years, Laura Bailey and Travis Willingham, Dante Basco, James Buckley, Lannan Eacott, Kumail Nanjiani, and pop punk band Neck Deep.

=== 2016–2019: Branching out from video games ===
In January 2016, Lindsay Jones became the head of Achievement Hunter, succeeding Ramsey. In April 2016, Achievement Hunter launched two new shows. A new series called VR the Champions premiered on YouTube and featured Haywood, Dooley, and other members testing out new gameplay in virtual reality. In addition, a First Member only show known as Theater Mode was created, and includes hosts like Jones, Ramsey, and Pattillo, as well as others, watching horrible movies and commenting on them. Later in 2016, Achievement Hunter introduced RouLet's Play, where hosts play a game at random, Heroes and Halfwits, a sort of dungeons and dragons gameplay with Haywood, Jones, Ramsey, Griffon Ramsey, and Gus Sorola, and Schooled in which Ramsey and his daughter Millie teach kids to play video games in hopes of defeating the main Achievement Hunter members.

In February 2017, Ramsey announced his sabbatical from the company. At this time, it was also announced that Trevor Collins was the new head of Achievement Hunter, succeeding Jones. Later on, two months into his break, Ramsey and Millie premiered the second season of Schooled. This time around the kids were being trained by the main members to battle each other. In April, Achievement Hunter went on tour on the east coast to perform Let's Play Live! with Funhaus in New Jersey, Maryland, and Florida.

As part of Rooster Teeth's Pilot Month, a test episode of a new ghost hunting show called Achievement Haunter premiered on May 17, 2018. The episode was considered a success and the series was green-lit for an eight episode first season, which aired on October 31, 2018.

Hardcore Tabletop, a show that takes board games and gives them real world twists, premiered on August 21, 2018. The first season had Achievement Hunter personalities play Monopoly with real money, with the potential to earn up to $20,580. The second season, titled Hardcore Tabletop: World Series, aired on April 10, 2019, and returned to Monopoly with Diaz as the winner of the previous season and competitors from the Let's Play family including actor Dante Basco.

=== 2020–2023: Final years ===
On June 10, 2020, Achievement Hunter premiered their new show titled Hardcore Minigolf, where employees and friends of the company compete in a tournament style game of mini-golf.

On October 6, 2020, Haywood announced his departure from the company following a leak of explicit photographs and amid accusations of grooming fans, including some underage. On October 7, Rooster Teeth issued a statement saying they had "parted ways" for breach of the company's code of conduct. In a livestream held after a brief hiatus from the fallout, Pattillo and Michael Jones denounced Haywood, announcing that several videos featuring him would be removed from Rooster Teeth's library.

In May 2021, three featured contract missions created by members of Achievement Hunter were added to Hitman 3.

Dooley departed Achievement Hunter in 2021, moving to a recurring role (largely due to having moved back to his home state of Massachusetts the previous year), while Bragg's full-time role was dissolved in 2022, leading to part-time contract work. Meanwhile, several Achievement Hunter employees began new projects over its final years: Ramsey and Free started the podcast F**kFace with Andrew Panton; Pattillo and BlackKrystel moved to Inside Gaming; Lindsay Jones continued their voice work as Ruby Rose in RWBY VTubing; and Cooke produced several projects at Rooster Teeth.

On September 18, 2023, Rooster Teeth announced that Achievement Hunter would be dissolved, with remaining cast members Michael Jones, Collins, Diaz, and Lee moving to a new channel called Dogbark. The final video—a Let's Play of Burnout Paradise, like Achievement Hunter's first video, featuring Ramsey, Pattillo, Michael Jones, and Collins—was released on October 1. The Let's Play YouTube channel was subsequently taken over by F**kface, publishing its first video under the rebrand on October 6, 2023.

=== 2024: Closure of Rooster Teeth ===
In March 2024, it was announced that Rooster Teeth would be shut down. Dogbark published its final video on April 21 and was later rebranded Mikey & Fredo post-closure, with Michael Jones and Alfredo Diaz taking over the former Dogbark channel and social media accounts. The Let's Play channel published its final video on May 1. In July 2024, the skeleton crew still working for Rooster Teeth post-closure announced that nearly 4600 old Achievement Hunter videos that were originally published on the Rooster Teeth YouTube channel have been moved over to the Achievement Hunter YouTube channel.

== Let's Play Live ==
Let's Play Live! was an on-stage event produced by Rooster Teeth in which the Achievement Hunter members play video games and perform comedy sketches in front of a live audience. Their first event was held on February 20, 2015, at the Moody Theater in Austin, Texas.

Three more Let's Play Live! events were held in 2016, with the first at the Dolby Theatre in Hollywood, California on June 17, the second at the Chicago Theatre in Chicago, Illinois on August 19, and the third at the Hammerstein Ballroom in New York City, New York on October 8. These events also featured appearances by other members of the Let's Play family; Funhaus, ScrewAttack, Kinda Funny, Cow Chop and The Creatures.

In 2017, four Let's Play Live! shows were announced as the East Coast Tour. The tour was held from April 24 to 30, with them going to the New Jersey Performing Arts Center in Newark, New Jersey, the Hippodrome Theatre in Baltimore, Maryland, Hard Rock Live in Orlando, Florida and the Straz Center for the Performing Arts in Tampa, Florida.

== Charity ==
With members of Rooster Teeth that work outside of Achievement Hunter, the group works with different charities to raise money through livestreams and other methods. This is in part to Jack Pattillo being a part of Achievement Hunter and Rooster Teeth's Charity Director, causing him to be a large part of organizing events, promoting them on the Achievement Hunter page, and asking fans and friends to be a part of the event. He summed up the point in a statement; "When Rooster Teeth calls on its fans to support a cause, we can count on them to help us make a huge impact."

Through cooperation between Make-A-Wish and the Achievement Hunter parent company Rooster Teeth, the members of Achievement Hunter met teenager Erik Battany during RTX in August 2015. Battany and his family had been gifted VIP passes to RTX 2015, meeting them at a VIP party and the next day played with members for an Assassin's Creed Syndicate mission. On May 23, 2014, there was another visitor through Make-A-Wish, a boy named Jacob.

== List of shows ==
Series	Primary contributor(s)	Series premiere	Series finale
Forced Enjoyment	Geoff Ramsey, Jack Pattillo	March 25, 2008	July 28, 2010
Achievement Guides/Achievement Unlocked	Various	July 29, 2008	February 2, 2019
Pajamachievements	Griffon Ramsey	December 20, 2008	September 25, 2009
Easter Eggs	Various	July 14, 2009	February 21, 2019
Achievement Hunter Weekly Update (AHWU)	Various	March 4, 2010	May 17, 2021
Behind the Scenes	Various	May 5, 2010	May 9, 2017
Fails of the Weak	Geoff Ramsey, Jack Pattillo	September 22, 2010	May 13, 2016
Achievement HORSE/PIG	Geoff Ramsey, Jack Pattillo	December 6, 2010	January 2, 2016
Rage Quit	Michael Jones	January 20, 2011	July 12, 2019
This Is ...	Various	March 29, 2011	August 14, 2015
Things to Do In:	Various	November 30, 2011	October 11, 2016
Let's Play	Various	December 7, 2011	October 1, 2023
A Look Back At	Brandon "Fragger" Light, Ray Narvaez Jr.	December 16, 2011	August 15, 2012
Game Night	Geoff Ramsey, Caleb Denecour	March 23, 2012	February 14, 2014
Trials Files	Geoff Ramsey, Jack Pattillo	April 24, 2012	November 4, 2014
Retro Active	Brandon "Fragger" Light	May 30, 2012	October 31, 2012
Quick Bits	Various	August 20, 2012	December 17, 2012
Five Facts	Geoff Ramsey, Jack Pattillo, Franco Scarcello	September 11, 2012	May 17, 2016
Coming Soon	Kdin Jenzen	March 5, 2013	May 1, 2015
Versus (VS)	Various	March 8, 2013	January 19, 2017 (Note: A one-off 150th episode was released on September 24, 2023.)
GO!	Various	October 29, 2013	August 28, 2016
Achievement HUNT	Various	October 30, 2013	May 10, 2016
How To:	Joel Heyman, Adam Ellis, Jeremy Dooley, Matt Bragg	February 6, 2014	May 15, 2016
Play Pals	Michael Jones, Gavin Free	May 8, 2014	September 19, 2023
Countdown / Top Five	Various	May 12, 2014	January 5, 2016
Imaginary Achievements	Jeremy Dooley	August 13, 2014	April 8, 2015
MegaCraft	Matt Bragg	August 18, 2014	August 12, 2015
Let's Watch	Various	September 18, 2014	November 12, 2021
Grab Bag	Various	September 25, 2014	April 21, 2016
Achievement Hunter vs. The World	Various	October 16, 2014	May 8, 2016
Sunday Driving	Various	November 6, 2014	March 2, 2020
Shenanigans	Various	December 19, 2014	August 16, 2019
Presented With Comment	Jeremy Dooley (host)	August 1, 2015	January 7, 2016
Off Topic	Michael Jones (host)	October 30, 2015	September 30, 2023
Great Levels in Gaming	Max Bernard	December 29, 2015	May 30, 2016
VR the Champions	Various	April 12, 2016	March 28, 2020
Theater Mode	Various	April 29, 2016	June 28, 2019
Heroes and Halfwits	Frank J. Kim, Geoff Ramsey, Griffon Ramsey, Michael Jones, Gus Sorola, Ryan Haywood	June 9, 2016	August 15, 2018
RouLetsPlay	Various	September 29, 2016	June 25, 2021
Schooled	Geoff Ramsey, Millie Ramsey	October 3, 2016	May 17, 2017
Between the Games	Various	October 11, 2016	September 29, 2023
Battle Buddies	Ryan Haywood, Jeremy Dooley	May 9, 2017	March 3, 2020
Chaos Corner	Lindsay Jones	December 28, 2017	February 5, 2019
AH Animated	Various	January 25, 2018	July 13, 2023 (Note: A one-off final episode was released on September 26, 2023.)
Let's Roll	Various	July 20, 2018	September 28, 2023
Hardcore Tabletop: Monopoly	Various	August 21, 2018	October 2, 2018
Hardcore Tabletop: World Series	Various	April 17, 2019	May 22, 2019
Achievement Haunter / Haunter	Geoff Ramsey, Gavin Free, Michael Jones, Jeremy Dooley, Ryan Haywood, Jack Pattillo, Lindsay Jones	October 31, 2018	March 26, 2020
Ready Set Show	Jeremy Dooley, Trevor Collins	February 25, 2019	August 3, 2022
Clickbait / This Just Internet	Fiona Nova, Lindsay Jones	September 4, 2020	April 8, 2021 (Note: A special episode was released for Black History Month on February 28, 2023.)
Technical Difficulties	Ryan Haywood	April 28, 2020	September 29, 2020
Hardcore Mini Golf	Various	June 12, 2020	July 30, 2020

== Cast ==
- Geoff Ramsey (main 2008–2019; recurring 2019–2022)
- Jack Pattillo (contract 2008–2009; main 2009–2023)
- Gavin Free (contract 2008–2011; main 2012–2023; recurring 2023)
- Ray Narvaez Jr. (contract 2010–2011; main 2012–2015)
- Caleb Denecour (recurring 2010–2016)
- Michael Jones (contract 2011; main 2011–2023)
- Ryan Haywood (recurring 2011–2012; main 2013–2020)
- Lindsay Jones (recurring 2013–2016; main 2017–2023)
- Kdin Jenzen (recurring 2013–2016)
- Jeremy Dooley (recurring 2014–2015, 2021–2022; main 2015–2021)
- Matt Bragg (2014–2019, 2022–2023; main 2019–2022)
- Trevor Collins (recurring 2015–2018; main 2018–2023)
- Mica Burton (2016–2017)
- Alfredo Diaz (recurring 2017–2018; main 2019–2023)
- Fiona Nova (2019–2021)
- Kylah "Ky" Cooke (main 2021–2022; recurring 2022–2023)
- BlackKrystel (2021–2023)
- Joe "LoeJeez" Lee (2021–2023)

Main Cast Recurring / Contract Cast
