= Gavin Free =

English actor, director, cinematographer and internet personality (born 1988)

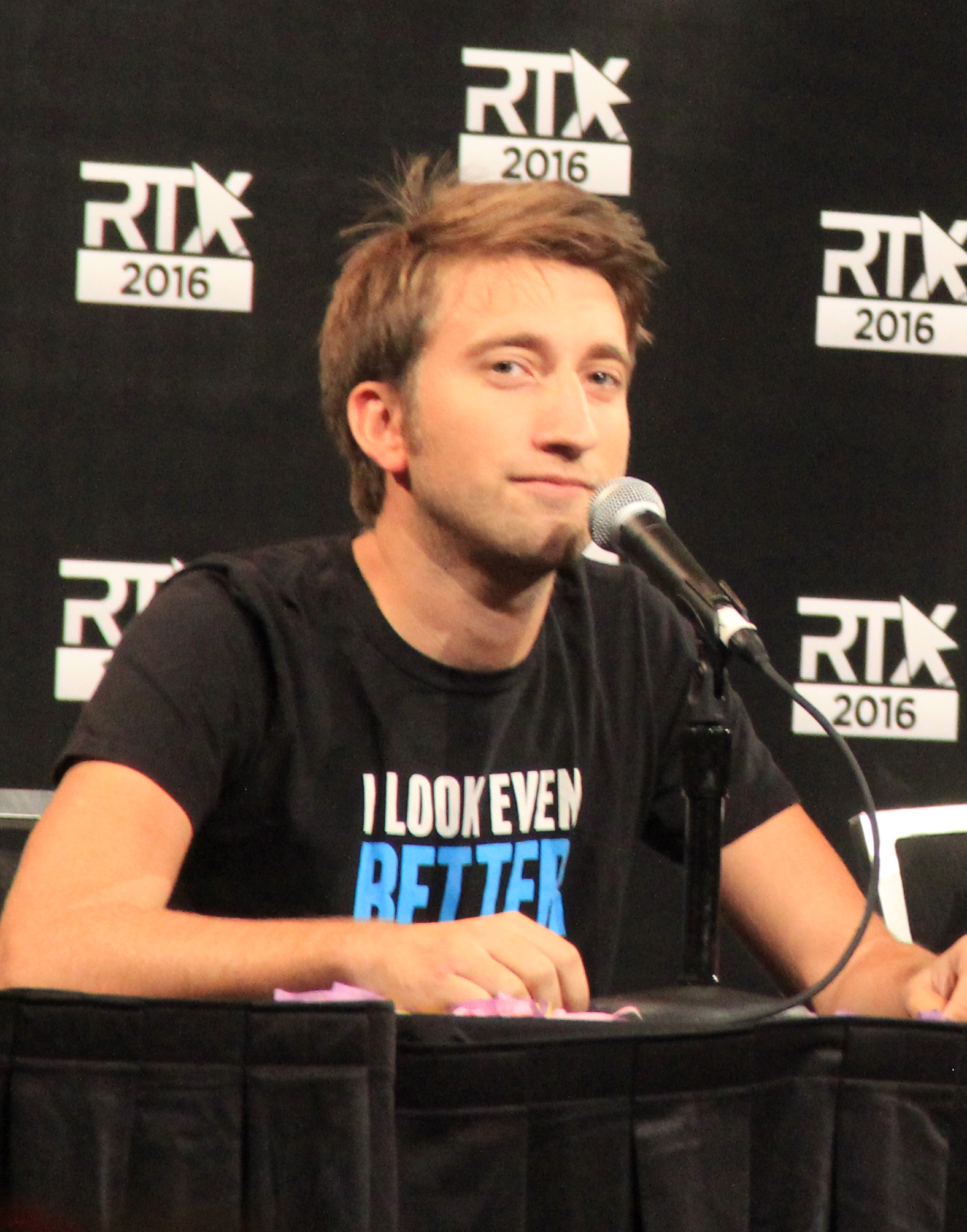
- Gavin Free at RTX 2016
- Born: Gavin David Free; 23 May 1988 (age 38); Thame, England
- Occupations: Producer, director, cinematographer, actor
- Years active: 2006–present
- Known for: The Slow Mo Guys; Achievement Hunter; Rooster Teeth
- Spouse: Meg Turney (m. 2024)

Gavin David Free (born 23 May 1988) is an English actor, director, cinematographer and internet personality. He is best known for his work at Rooster Teeth—where he formerly served as creative director—featuring in many of their projects, including the Achievement Hunter gaming division. He directed season 7 of Red vs. Blue, as well as its miniseries Relocated.

Free is also known as the creator and co-host of the YouTube-based web series The Slow Mo Guys, alongside his friend Daniel Gruchy. The series features slow-motion footage of various stunts and experiments, garnering as of February 2022 over 2.2 billion views since its launch in 2010. In April 2011, the channel was voted the winner of YouTube's On The Rise program. In September 2012, their episode involving crushing watermelons was featured on The Tonight Show. Free has appeared alongside Gruchy in the annual YouTube Rewind series from 2013 to 2017. Free was nominated for a Webby Award in the Best Web Personality/Host (Online Film & Video) category for his work on The Slow Mo Guys on 5 April 2016.

His acting roles include Woody in Lazer Team and its sequel, Vav in the animated comedy series X-Ray and Vav, and Scarlet David in RWBY. He is also known for his slow motion cinematography work for films, including Hot Fuzz (2007), Sherlock Holmes: A Game of Shadows (2011), Snow White and the Huntsman (2012), and Dredd (2012). Free has also worked on slow-motion footage for the BBC show Top Gear. At the 2016 Streamy Awards, Free won for Cinematography.

== Early life ==
Free was born in Thame in Oxfordshire where he attended Lord Williams's School.

In 2006, he joined Green Door Films, the first production house in Europe to use Phantom digital high-speed cameras as a source of slow motion, working as a data technician and camera operator. He has worked on adverts and music videos for U2, Enter Shikari, Klaxons, Kasabian, The Chemical Brothers, X-Press 2, and the "Everybody Hurts" charity single.

Free also worked at his local Waitrose, where he met Daniel Gruchy.

== Career ==
=== Red vs. Blue and Slow Mo Guys: 2009–2010 ===
In 2009, he was hired by Austin, Texas–based Rooster Teeth Productions to direct the seventh season of their machinima series Red vs. Blue. Free also directed its mini-series Relocated. He acted in Rooster Teeth's comedy mini-series Captain Dynamic and began appearing in Rooster Teeth Shorts the same year.

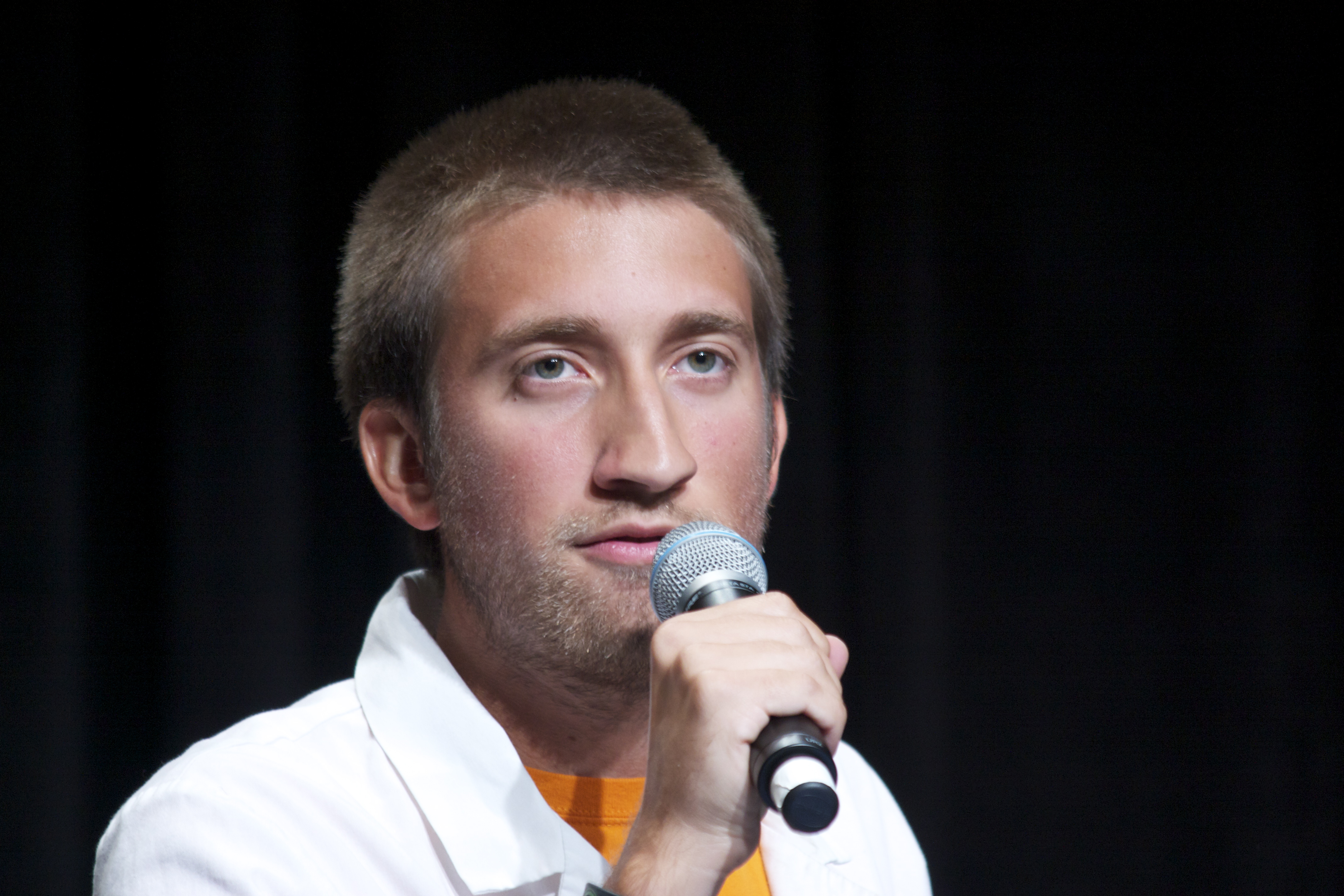
Free in 2013

In 2010, he created The Slow Mo Guys along with friend Daniel Gruchy in order to get a work visa. The Slow Mo Guys consists largely of various objects being filmed using Free's Phantom high-speed cameras. As of February 2022, their YouTube channel has garnered over 2.2 billion views and 14.2 million subscribers. In April 2011, the channel was voted the winner of YouTube's On The Rise program, which highlights up-and-coming YouTube partners on the homepage. In September 2012, they were featured on The Tonight Show. In February 2013, Free announced that The Slow Mo Guys had been picked up by Rooster Teeth and that further episodes of the series would be released on Rooster Teeth's website, as well as the series' existing YouTube channel.

On 23 February 2015, Free and Gruchy created a partner channel to The Slo Mo Guys, The Slo Mo Guys 2, as a channel for "laid back 'out of labcoats' content that doesn't fit on the main channel" As of February 2021, the channel has 41.8 million views and 831k subscribers.

=== Rooster Teeth and Achievement Hunter: 2012–2024 ===
Free joined Achievement Hunter (a video gaming division of Rooster Teeth founded by Geoff Ramsey and Jack Pattillo) in 2008 as a contract host before becoming one of the main six hosts in 2012. He is one of the most prolific employees on the site, regularly appearing in their Let's Play series of videos, its podcast Off Topic, and tutorials of how to get achievements and find easter eggs in video games.

In May 2013, Free began starring as a "lab rat" in the Rooster Teeth series Immersion, replacing Geoff Ramsey and Gus Sorola. In Immersion, Free must test video concepts in real life alongside friend and co-worker Michael Jones. He was a contestant in the second season of Rooster Teeth's gaming show The Gauntlet in 2013. Free has had two cameo appearances in Barenaked Ladies music videos for their songs "Odds Are" (2013) and "Did I Say That Out Loud?" (2014). In the latter video, he is portrayed as accidentally lighting himself on fire when trying to play a song for his domestic partner Meg Turney, which subsequently goes viral. Free and The Slow Mo Guys co-star Daniel Gruchy appeared in YouTube Rewind in 2013, playing themselves being pulled by an RV, itself a nod to Breaking Bad, while an explosion goes off behind them. They both returned for the YouTube Rewinds from 2014 to 2017.

Free began starring in the Rooster Teeth animated superhero comedy web series X-Ray and Vav in November 2014. He voiced Vav alongside former Achievement Hunter employee Ray Narvaez, Jr., who voices X-Ray. The season was renewed for a second season, which premiered in July 2015. That same year, he appeared in Rooster Teeth's murder mystery comedy series Ten Little Roosters as a fictionalised version of himself and was a contestant on the improvised comedy series @midnight on Comedy Central.

In 2015, Free and Rooster Teeth co-founder Burnie Burns hosted multiple episodes of the hypothetical scenario series Million Dollars, But..., in which each person comes up with a typically difficult scenario; for example, having to date Adolf Hitler for a year — which the cast comically re-enact — for which they will be given a million dollars. The pilot episode premiered on 21 May 2015, with the series continuing on 9 July 2015. He was a reactor on the web series YouTubers React in August 2015. Free became the creative director of Rooster Teeth in October 2015, replacing Burnie Burns who was then promoted to chief creative officer. However, he stepped down in early 2016, wanting to "dedicate his time in 2016 to The Slow Mo Guys."

In 2016, Free starred as Woody in Rooster Teeth's science fiction action comedy film Lazer Team. The film was released theatrically on 27 January 2016. It received mixed to positive reviews from critics at film festival showings and upon its release. He joined the voice cast of the anime web series RWBY as Scarlet David for its third volume.

On 5 April 2016, Free was nominated for a Webby Award in the Best Web Personality/Host (Online Film & Video) category for his work on The Slow Mo Guys. At the 2016 Streamy Awards Free won for Cinematography.

== Personal life ==
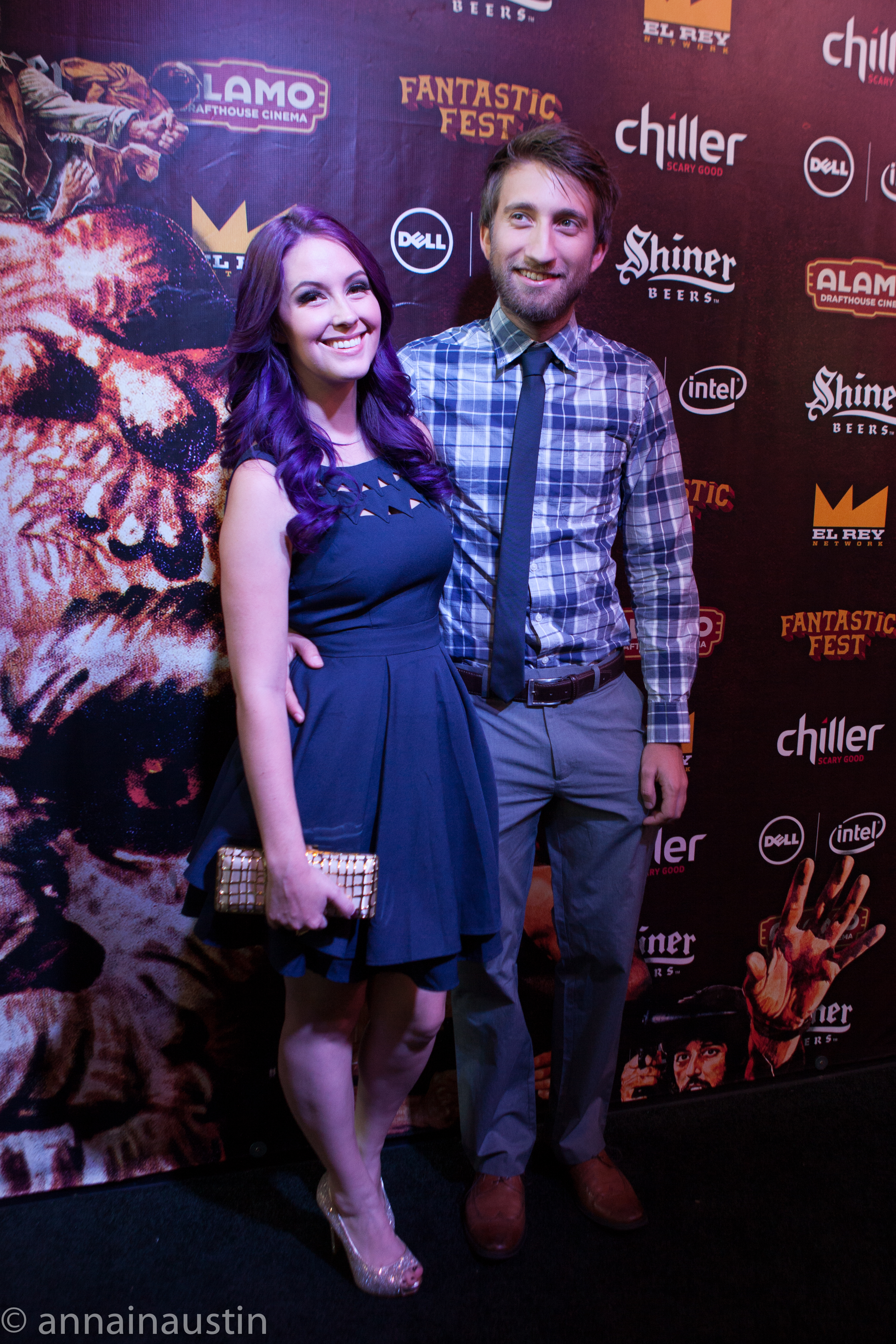
Meg Turney and Gavin Free at the premiere of Lazer Team in 2015

Free has been in a relationship with Meg Turney since 2013. In September 2024, it was revealed that the two got married in England. As of March 2019, he is now a permanent resident of the United States.

Free has maintained a longtime close friendship with fellow Achievement Hunter, Michael Jones, since the pair met in 2012. Free was a groomsman in Jones’ wedding.

On 26 January 2018, an armed man broke into the couple's Austin home armed with a handgun, firing one shot while the two hid in a closet and contacted authorities. The suspect was confronted by police in the driveway and after an exchange of gunfire was killed by one of the officers. The gunman, an obsessed fan of Turney's, had driven 11 hours from Albuquerque, New Mexico, to the couple's home. He was reportedly resentful of Free's fame and relationship. Free and Turney were unharmed in the incident.

== Filmography ==
=== Web ===
Year	Title	Role	Notes
2008–2009	Red vs. Blue	Jones (voice)	Also director of season 7 and Relocated
2009	Captain Dynamic	Gavin	
2009–2019	Rooster Teeth Shorts	Gavin	
2010–present	The Slow Mo Guys	Himself	Also producer and editor
2013	The Gauntlet	Himself, Contestant	Season 2 only
2013	Chris Hardwick's All-Star Celebrity Bowling	Himself	Episode: "Nerdist vs. Rooster Teeth"
2013	"Odds Are"	American Football player	Music video
2013–2015	YouTube Rewind	The Slow Mo Guys	
2013–2016	Immersion	Himself	Seasons 2 and 3
2014	"Did I Say That Out Loud?"	thatguy21	Music video
2014	Ten Little Roosters	Gavin Prime / Gavin Two	Mini-series
2014-2015	X-Ray and Vav	Vav (voice)	Based on characters created by Lindsay Jones and Jordan Cwierz
2014–2016	Happy Hour	Himself	
2015	YouTubers React	Himself	3 episodes
2015	RWBY	Scarlet David (voice)	Volume 3
2016	Crunch Time	Gavin	Episode: "The Big Sleep"
2016	Day 5	Morgue Raver	Episode: "Cognitive Dissonance"
2016	The Eleven Little Roosters	Gavin III	
2018	The Super Slow Show	Himself	Also producer and editor. A YouTube Original series, not to be confused with YouTube Red Original Series.
2019	Planet Slow Mo	Himself	Another YouTube Original Series.

=== Film ===
Year	Title	Role	Notes
2015	Let's Play Live: The Documentary	Himself	Documentary
2015	Lazer Team	Woody	
2015	Reunited	Newscaster 2	Short film
2017	Lazer Team 2	Woody	
2018	Blood Fest	Himself	

=== Television ===
Year	Title	Role	Notes
2014, 2016	@midnight	Himself, Contestant	2 episodes
2015, 2018	The Late Late Show with James Corden	Himself	2 episodes
2022	The Slow Mo Guys' Big Adventures	Himself	10 episodes

=== Video games ===
Year	Title	Role	Notes
2019	Trials Rising	Himself	

=== Non-performance credits ===
Year	Title	Notes
2007	Top Gear	Slow Motion Cinematographer, 1 episode
2007	Hot Fuzz	High speed camera
2011	The Good Cook	Cameraman
2011	Sherlock Holmes: A Game of Shadows	Phantom download technician
2012	Snow White and the Huntsman	Slow Motion Cinematographer
2012	Dredd	Slow Motion Cinematographer
2016	Red vs. Blue	Phantom operator

=== Podcasts ===
Year	Title	Notes
2009–2024	Rooster Teeth Podcast	"Best Gaming Podcast" at the Podcast Awards (2012 & 2013)
2014	Internet Box	Guest (Episode XX)
2015–2023	Off Topic	Achievement Hunter podcast
2020–2024	F**kface	
2024–present	Regulation Podcast	The F**kface podcast was renamed following the closure of Rooster Teeth in 2024.
