= The Eleven Little Roosters =

American spy comedy

- Genre: Comedy, Thriller
- Created by: Josh Flanagan
- Starring: Zach Anner; Burnie Burns; Chris Demarais; Barbara Dunkelman; Adam Ellis; Josh Flanagan; Gavin Free; Blaine Gibson; Bruce Greene; Ryan Haywood; Matt Hullum; Ashley Jenkins; Michael Jones; Adam Kovic; Miles Luna; Aaron Marquis; Jack Pattillo; Geoff Ramsey; Griffon Ramsey; Mariel Salcedo; Lawrence Sonntag; Gus Sorola; Elyse Willems; James Willems
- Country of origin: United States
- Original language: English
- No. of episodes: 8

Production
- Producers: Burnie Burns; Matt Hullum
- Production location: Austin, Texas
- Running time: 5–10 minutes
- Production company: Rooster Teeth

Original release
- Network: Rooster Teeth
- Release: January 16 – March 6, 2017

Related
- Ten Little Roosters

The Eleven Little Roosters is an American spy comedy web series created by Josh Flanagan and co-directed and co-written by Blaine Gibson and Flanagan. It stars Zach Anner, Burnie Burns, Barbara Dunkelman, Gavin Free, Ashley Jenkins, Geoff Ramsey and Gus Sorola. It is the successor to the 2014 series Ten Little Roosters, acting as a spy thriller that pits international assassins against each other. It premiered on Rooster Teeth's website on January 16, 2017.

== Format ==
After the success of Ten Little Roosters, creator Josh Flanagan wanted to "fully deliver" on the concept by expanding the cast, scope, and storyline and adding new levels of interaction, describing it as, "Avengers: Infinity War of Rooster Teeth." Each episode, characters are killed, and viewers who predict plot points by "synthesizing" clues such as hidden QR codes, in-dialogue hints, and audio cues win prizes. It feature cameos and 360 video segments.

== Cast ==
- Zach Anner as Annersby, a non-combatant who assists Gavin at MI6
- Burnie Burns as Burnardo Burnadicci, of the Italian Defense Division
- Chris Demarais as Cristoph Weiss, from the Swedish Security Service
- Barbara Dunkelman as Agent Moose, a non-combatant from the Canadian Assassins League
- Adam Ellis as Comrade Hadam, of the Komitee for State Security
- Josh Flanagan as The Colonel, a non-combatant from the Rooster Corps
- Gavin Free as Gavin The 3rd, an MI6 agent
- Blaine Gibson as Agent Gibson, a CIA agent
- Bruce Greene as Brüce, a member of the Sex Von Shaukel Boyz
- Ryan Haywood as Ryan Haywood, a non-combatant and survivor of a similar situation.
- Matt Hullum as The Big Cock, non-combatant and leader of the Rooster Corps
- Ashley Jenkins as Agent Jinx, another CIA agent
- Michael Jones as Operator Mikey, a non-combatant who assists Gavin at MI6
- Adam Kovic as Koko, another member of the Sex Von Shaukel Boyz
- Miles Luna as La Luna Loco, a member of the Asesino Mexicano Espia
- Aaron Marquis as Marquee Marquis, of the French Association of Professionals
- Jack Pattillo as Jack the Red, of the Norwegian Viking Coalition
- Geoff Ramsey as Boomerang Geoff, from Whatever Australia Has
- Griffon Ramsey as The Griffon, from Whatever Australia Has
- Mariel Salcedo as Madam Mariel, from Asesino Mexicano Espia
- Lawrence Sonntag as Lars, the third member of the Sex Von Shaukel Boyz
- Gus Sorola as So'Rolla, from the Asesino Mexicano Espia
- Elyse Willems as Agent Knuckle, of the Canadian Assassins League
- James Willems as Wilhelm, the final member of the Sex Von Shaukel Boyz

== Episodes ==
No.	Title	Directed by	Written by	Original release date
1	"Spy Games"	Josh Flanagan & Blaine Gibson	Josh Flanagan & Blaine Gibson	January 16, 2017
At a base in Croatia, Agent Moose of the Canadian Assassins League (CAL) successfully infiltrates and seemingly kills Captain Gruber. However, to her surprise, she finds out that she killed Jack the Red of the Norwegian Viking Coalition (NVC). Meanwhile at Mi6, Gavin the 3rd convinces his handler, Annersby, to let him operate as a field agent again despite failed test results. An emergency meeting is held at the Rooster Corps, where The Big Cock announces the death of Jack the Red, and that Moose was given false orders to go to Croatia, meaning that there is a mole among them. The assassins can continue their missions and operations as normal, but must also be aware and find the mole as soon as possible. Additionally, Moose is disavowed and Agent Knuckle is brought in to represent Canada in her stead. After the meeting, Moose is approached by the Colonel, who offers her a second chance and encourages her to get to the bottom of this case. He then recommends her to get in contact with Ryan Haywood, the sole survivor of the Austin, Texas dinner party massacre, who now works as a consultant for the Rooster Corps.
2	"Honor Among Assassins"	Josh Flanagan & Blaine Gibson	Josh Flanagan & Blaine Gibson	January 23, 2017
Marquee Marquis of the French Association of Professionals (FAP) prepares to assassinate a man, but hesitates to do so. At a park in Paris, Moose finds Marquis, and he confesses to her that he doesn't kill men, only women and children. The reason why is because some years ago, his father was seemingly killed by a young girl. Knuckle arrives and decides to take Marquis' assignment instead. In London, Gavin spends time with the members of the Asesino Mexicano Espia (AME), consisting of Madam Mariel (who Gavin slept with), La Luna Loco, and So'rolla (who "stepped in"), before they leave to celebrate the latter's quinceañera. At the Rooster Corps HQ, Burnardo Burnadicci of the Italian Defense Division (IDD) and Agent Gibson of the CIA get into a brief argument, while Christoph Weiss of the Swedish Security Service (SSS) tells an arriving Marquis that a new assignment came for him, but doesn't know who sent it, leading them to be suspicious that it might be another fake file from the mole. Marquis takes the assignment nonetheless. In Australia, Boomerang Geoff and The Griffon of Whatever Australia Has (WAH) decide to wait it out for the mole in their safehouse. Marquis' assignment is to kill "three mermaids", but the mermaids turn out to be Mariel, La Luna, and So'rolla who were celebrating their quinceañera. Marquis screams in agony for the deaths of the two men, while a hooded figure observes the scene and leaves.
3	"Recon Rebirth"	Josh Flanagan & Blaine Gibson	Josh Flanagan & Blaine Gibson	January 30, 2017
In Russia, Comrade Hadam of the KGB meets with Vladimir Putin about the saboteur, and Putin advises Hadam to prepare for the "National Game". Meanwhile, Moose meets with Marquis eating at a restaurant, where she finds a clue on how to know if the files are fake. She also finds a message from Ryan which prompts her to leave. In London, Annersby gives Gavin some new gadgets: a communicator in the form of a pistol, a cyanide container (which resembles the Tower of Pimps), and a shrink ray (which is bugged as it actually enlarges things). In Germany, the Sex Von Shaukel Boyz (SSB), consisting of Brüce, Wilhelm, Lars, and Koko, are about to prepare for a concert, but the band members find rumors that Koko has been in a relationship with Yoko Ono, which causes in-fighting and tension among them. Elsewhere, Burnadicci laments about being "too old", but resolves to become a new man and heads out. Back in France, Marquis finds the girl who supposedly killed his father, and confronts her. However, it is revealed that the girl is actually Burnadicci's daughter, Margaret, and that he was the one who killed Marquis' father years ago. Burnadicci then executes Marquis for threatening his daughter and leaves.
4	"The Most Dangerous Game"	Josh Flanagan & Blaine Gibson	Josh Flanagan & Blaine Gibson	February 6, 2017
In Canada, Hadam meets with Moose and informs her that he will be participating in Russia's "national game". He invites Moose (who fears for his life because the game is to the death) to watch because he believes that the mole will be present, and hopes that she will flush them out. It is then revealed that Hadam was originally Canadian (named Gordan at the time), and he and Moose were in a relationship at one point before he switched his citizenship to Russian. At the CIA headquarters in Virginia, Gibson is jealous of Jinx's sex appeal, and the two get into an argument before Jinx storms off. Back in London, Gavin is visited by Hadam, who knocks him out with sleeping gas. Gavin later wakes up trapped on a stage with Hadam, as he announces that the "national game" has started. It is revealed that the Russia's national game is a real-life version of Tetris. As the game progresses, Moose notices a suspicious hooded figure in the audience, who runs away. She goes to warn Hadam about the mole, but both he and Gavin are trapped by the constantly stacking Tetris blocks. Gavin then uses the new gadgets he obtained from Annersby to win the game, but Hadam gets crushed by the onslaught of Tetris blocks, killing him and leaving Moose distraught. After the game, Moose gets a message from Ryan, with him saying that the Germans (more specifically the SSB) will be the next to strike, but who their target is remains a mystery.
5	"Rogue Nation"	Josh Flanagan & Blaine Gibson	Josh Flanagan & Blaine Gibson	February 13, 2017
Back in Berlin, the members of SSB find out that Koko is planning his own solo career. This divides the band members, and they go their own separate ways. At the Rooster Corps HQ, Moose (accompanied by Knuckle) reports to the Big Cock about Ryan's message, and he sends out the message to the remaining Rooster Corps members. At this time, Wilhelm visits Burnadicci in Italy, Lars visits Gavin in London, Brüce visits Gibson in Virginia, and Koko visits Geoff and Griffon in Australia. They each receive the Big Cock's message, but they misinterpret it (except for Griffon, who decoded the message right away). Moose and Knuckle investigate at the SSB's base, where they find a file saying that the Germans are not the moles, but were brainwashed, set to be activated when someone says certain trigger words. Back in Italy, Burnadicci converses with Wilhelm, inadvertently saying the trigger words which causes Wilhelm to attack and kill Burnadicci. The remaining members of the SSB arrive and stop Wilhelm, and they all reconcile and plan a reunion tour. Moose then arrives too late, and reports to the Big Cock of Burnadicci's death. With the loss of many of their top agents, the Big Cock decides it's time to get himself personally involved in the investigation.
6	"Born Identities"	Josh Flanagan & Blaine Gibson	Josh Flanagan & Blaine Gibson	February 20, 2017
At the Rooster Corps, Ryan informs Moose and the Big Cock that three of their agents are not who they say they are. One of the agents is Geoff, who in actuality is just Geoff Ramsey, a former Rooster Teeth employee who went "off the grid" to work for Rooster Corps following the deaths of his fellow employees from the dinner massacre. His partner, The Griffon, is also revealed to be his wife, Griffon Ramsey, who went off to kill the Boyz for murdering Burnadicci. Moose then finds the third of the false agents, Weiss, who is actually Chris Demarais. Chris himself believed he died in the dinner massacre years ago, but miraculously survived with no memory of what happened before. Chris accepts his new identity as Christoph Weiss, while channeling his inner Lord of the Rings obsession and agrees to help Moose stop Griffon from killing the Boyz. In London, Gibson storms into Gavin's room, where he finds Jinx has been sleeping with him (as well as Knuckle), and is angry at the fact that Gavin doesn't want to "bang him". Gibson leaves, vowing revenge for rejection. Meanwhile, the Boyz are rehearsing on top of a narrow catwalk high above the ground. Griffon arrives and prepares to kill them, but is stopped by Weiss, who cuts off part of the catwalk separating him and Griffon. Griffon shoots Weiss, who falls off the catwalk and dies landing face first into the ground (obviously parodying Gandalf's death). Griffon attempts to shoot the Boyz once again, but they escape.
7	"Double Triple Cross"	Josh Flanagan & Blaine Gibson	Josh Flanagan & Blaine Gibson	February 27, 2017
The Boyz celebrate their reunion tour, despite Moose's warnings that the mole is still out there. At Rooster Corps HQ, while finding a depressed Gibson, Jinx notices the Big Cock packing his things. He tells her that the Corps has been compromised, but Jinx says that the mole could still get their hands on the superweapon (which has been hinted at in the previous episodes). The Big Cock shares that the superweapon is The Hammer of Cock, a remote-controlled satellite orbiting Earth that can destroy anything. Jinx suggests destroying it so that the mole can't get their hands on it. Jinx and Gibson arrive at the superweapon's control center, where Jinx sets up a time bomb while Gibson looks for the core controlling the superweapon. To their surprise, the core is not there, and Knuckle appears before them. Knuckle explains that she was ordered to move the core and wait for the mole to appear. Both agencies mistake each other as the mole, and get into a fight. Due to them being distracted while fighting, the bomb goes off, killing all three of them. Back at Rooster Corps, the Big Cock hands control of the corps over to the Colonel. However, the Colonel betrays and kills the Big Cock, revealing him to be in league with the mole the whole time.
8	"Mission Critical"	Josh Flanagan & Blaine Gibson	Josh Flanagan & Blaine Gibson	March 6, 2017
The finale starts off with Griffon returning to Geoff after her failed attempt to kill the Boyz. The Aussie duo notices a bomb planted underneath them. Geoff states that he let various assassins into their hideout and before he reveals who planted the bomb, Geoff and Griffon are killed in the explosion. Meanwhile, Annersby is approached by Gavin where it's revealed that Operator Mikey isn't real and is just Gavin's split personality who ends up making him "Mavin". Moose finds out that Annersby is fine and makes her way to stop the Colonel and Mavin from killing the Boyz and using The Hammer of Cock. Back at the Rooster Corps Headquarters, Mavin prepares to fire The Hammer Of Cock at the Boyz, but the Boyz arrive to confront him. It's revealed that the masked DJ who was with the Boyz is Ryan in disguise who protected the Boyz and informed them of Mavin's betrayal. As Moose, Ryan, and the Boyz prepare to fight Mavin and the Colonel, Mavin reveals how he sabotaged the other assassins. Mavin sent Jack The Red to Croatia, gave the ASE the mermaid cutouts while giving Marquis the mission to kill "three mermaids", gave Margaret the red ball in order to cause a conflict between Burnaddici and Marquis, and brainwashed Wilhelm to kill Burnaddici while the remaining groups would become paranoid and kill each other. Throughout the final battle, Mavin easily defeats Ryan and the Boyz by consistently switching between his Gavin and Mikey personalities while Moose kills the Colonel by slicing his throat with her razor-sharp hat. Mavin launches the laser at the Boyz, but Lars pushes his band mates away and sacrifices himself. Since the Boyz are used to laser shows during their concerts, Koko, Bruce, and Wilhelm dodge the lasers with their dancing and proceed to kill Mavin by exploding his head with synchronized singing. Ryan then asks on what will happen to Rooster Corps since 10 organizations have been killed, to which Moose responds that Rooster Corps will be rebuilt. One year later, the Rooster Corps are replaced with the Ministry of Moose, along with new members including Agent Kojima (Hideo Kojima).
