= Bendy (franchise) =

American-Canadian media franchise

- Genres: Survival horror; Endless runner
- Developer: Joey Drew Studios
- Publisher: Joey Drew Studios
- Creators: Paul Crawford; Mike Desjardins
- Platforms: Microsoft Windows; macOS; Linux; iOS; Android (Ink Machine only); PlayStation 4; PlayStation 5; Xbox One; Xbox Series X/S; Nintendo Switch
- First release: Bendy and the Ink Machine; February 10, 2017
- Latest release: Bendy: Lone Wolf; August 15, 2025

Bendy is a horror game series and media franchise created by Paul Crawford and Mike Desjardins, credited respectively as theMeatly and Mike D.

== Overview ==
=== Gameplay ===
The Bendy games are set at the fictional studio of Joey Drew Studios, where the player navigates through a first-person perspective and have limited physical actions such as running and jumping. Players are required to complete certain objectives to proceed, which consist of solving certain puzzles by collecting certain objects and of combating enemies that appear through the games by using certain weapons, such as axe, pipe, gun, etc.

=== Story ===
Set in an undisclosed period in the first half of the 20th century, the series focuses on Joey Drew Studios, a fictional animation studio founded by Joey Drew, which, during its existence, was responsible for the creation of numerous popular cartoon characters such as Bendy and his friends. Before the closure of the studio, Drew acquired the titular Ink Machine, a mysterious device developed by the Gent Corporation in order to create living cartoons: the ink was derived from the souls of Drew's employees, which are additionally responsible for an alternate dimension stuck in a time loop called the Cycle. Each game has different protagonists trying to survive and free themselves from the horrors in the ink realm and against monsters created from the machine such as the Ink Demon.

=== Characters ===
Bendy, the titular character of the franchise, is a cartoon demon who serves as the mascot for Joey Drew Studios. He manifests in game as the Ink Demon, the Ink Machine's first creation, and a soulless monster that rules over the Cycle, which resets following his death. Other forms of the Ink Demon include a more benevolent cartoon Bendy and a monstrous form called Beast Bendy. The Ink Demon was the main villain of the first game and the spinoff, and the central antagonist of the second game.

Alice Angel is the female star of the Bendy cartoons. The two actresses who voiced the character, Susie Campbell and Allison Pendle, manifest as versions of Alice in the games. Susie manifests as Twisted Alice, a deformed, sadistic Alice who craves perfection, while Allison manifests as Allison Angel, a kindhearted survivor.

Boris the Wolf, one of Bendy's friends, had many clones in the Cycle, all murdered by Twisted Alice. A man known as Buddy became a kindhearted Boris named Buddy Boris. Thomas Conner, Allison's husband and an employee of the Gent Corporation, becomes Tom, a clone of Boris with a mechanical arm. Other versions of Boris include Brute Boris, a monstrous version of Buddy Boris after being experimented on by Twisted Alice, and Borkis, a clone of Boris with glowing eyes, who serves as a secret boss in Boris and the Dark Survival.

Other ink creatures include the Butcher Gang, Bendy's archenemies from the cartoons, who appear as recurring enemies in each game. The members include Charley / Piper, the primate leader of the Butcher Gang, Barley / Fisher, a human sailor, and Edgar / Striker, a spider. Bendy and the Dark Revival adds a female member to the Butcher Gang called Carley / Slicer, a ghost girl. Other enemies include Searchers and Lost Ones, former employees of Joey Drew Studios that have become trapped in the Cycle.

Each game has a different protagonist. The protagonist of Bendy and the Ink Machine and Bendy: The Cage is Henry Stein, an ink replica of Joey's former partner. Buddy Boris serves as the protagonist of Bendy: Lone Wolf. Bendy and the Dark Revival centers on Audrey Drew, the Ink Machine created daughter of Joey Drew. The Vessel(s) are the protagonists of Bendy: Secrets of the Machine.

Other human characters include Joey Drew, the founder of Joey Drew Studios, who indirectly caused the events of the series. Joey dies prior to the events of Bendy and the Dark Revival, but an ink replica of him guides Audrey. Wilson Arch is the main antagonist of Bendy and the Dark Revival. He is the son of Nathan Arch, founder of Arch Gate Pictures, and has disguised himself as a janitor to take over the Cycle with his creations, the Keepers. Towards the end of the game, Wilson becomes Shipahoy Wilson, a fusion of himself and his cartoon character, Shipahoy Dudley, who was meant to replace the Ink Demon.

Other humans-turned-ink monsters include Sammy Lawrence, the former music director of Joey Drew Studios who went insane and started to worship the Ink Demon as a deity. It is implied through audio logs that Sammy had a relationship with Susie Campbell. Norman Polk, former projectionist at Joey Drew Studios, was transformed into the Projectionist monster. Bertrum Piedmont, a world-renowned theme park designer hired by Joey Drew Studios, becomes a giant head fused with an amusement park ride.

The Gent Corporation are the presumed overarching antagonists of the series. The company is run by Alan Gray, an unseen character. Gent created the Ink Machine as well as other technology found throughout the Cycle.

=== Development ===
The Bendy franchise was inspired by the BioShock series, as both of them are set in the 20th century and both of them have an antique style. The idea for the concept of the series came from Paul Crawford (also known as TheMeatly) when he thought about a world that could resemble a cartoon sketch.

== Games ==
Timeline
2017	Bendy and the Ink Machine – "Chapter One: Moving Pictures"
2017	Bendy and the Ink Machine – "Chapter Two: The Old Song"
2017	Bendy and the Ink Machine – "Chapter Three: Rise and Fall"
2018	Bendy and the Ink Machine – "Chapter Four: Colossal Wonders"
2018	Bendy in Nightmare Run
2018	Bendy and the Ink Machine – "Chapter Five: The Last Reel"
2018	Bendy and the Ink Machine – "Chapter ?: The Archive"
2019
2020	Boris and the Dark Survival
2021
2022	Bendy and the Dark Revival
2023
2024	Bendy: Secrets of the Machine
2025	Bendy and the Brine Barrel
2025	Bendy: Lone Wolf
2026	Bendy's Nightmare Run (re-release)
2026	Bendy: The Cage
TBA	Bendy and the Ink Factory
TBA	Bendy: The Silent City
TBA	Bendy: The Lost Harbor

=== Bendy and the Ink Machine (2017–2018) ===
Bendy and the Ink Machine is an episodic survival horror game and the first instalment of the series. The game consists of five chapters and a final "behind the scenes" chapter, released from February 10, 2017, to October 28, 2018.

=== Boris and the Dark Survival (2020) ===
A prequel to Bendy and the Ink Machine was released on February 10, 2020, as part of the original game's third anniversary, on PC and mobile platforms. Players play as Boris the Wolf, an unnamed Lost One, and Sammy Lawrence. From an up-top vision as he navigates his way through Joey Drew Studios, running away from the Ink Demon, Alice Angel, the Butcher Gang, and the Projectionist. A teaser from Secrets of the Machine hints that the game will get the Bendy: Lone Wolf update. In 2024 it was announced that it would be discontinued and another game called Bendy: Lone Wolf based on this game would be released. Users who already owned this game will receive Bendy: Lone Wolf for free.

=== Bendy and the Dark Revival (2022) ===
Bendy and the Dark Revival is a first-person survival horror video game developed by Joey Drew Studios Inc. it is the third instalment of the Bendy franchise and sequel to Bendy and the Ink Machine. The game was released on November 15, 2022 for Windows, on March 1, 2023 for PlayStation 4 and Xbox One, and on July 11, 2025 for PlayStation 5, Xbox Series X/S, and Nintendo Switch to mixed reviews from critics. Players control Audrey, an animator who must navigate the world of Joey Drew Studios while avoiding creatures, occasionally solving puzzles along the way.

The game takes place roughly 10 years after the events of the original game and follows a character named Audrey, an animator who works for Arch Gate Pictures; the company that took over Joey Drew Studios after its bankruptcy.

==== Release Problems (2019–2022) ====
Bendy and the Dark Revival was announced on April 14, 2019. However, Mike Desjardins stated on February 13, 2019, that it would not serve as Bendy and the Ink Machine 2. A gameplay trailer was released on June 24, 2019, announcing the game's release for Fall 2019.

However, in December 2019, a new trailer was released to say that the game was being delayed and will release sometime in 2020. Another trailer was released on June 1, 2020, revealing that the game would be released in its entirety with all five chapters included, unlike the first game which was released episodically. The trailer also suggested the game would come out in the latter half of 2020. However, on November 30, 2020, the developers announced that the game would be releasing in 2021, due to the COVID-19 pandemic. The developers also cited that the game will be ten times bigger than the original game and that they didn't want to rush the game.

The game was nominated for the Outstanding Visual Style category in the 2022 Steam Awards, though lost out to the PC port of Spider-Man: Miles Morales.

=== Bendy: Secrets of the Machine (2024) ===
On April 2, 2024, the Steam store-page for Bendy: Secrets of the Machine was released to the public. So far, the game seems to be about the abandoned Gent Corporation and its mysteries. It was released on April 14, 2024. The game follows Riley Wells, a young woman chosen by the Gent Corporation to explore the Machine. Riley awakens outside a house in the middle of nowhere and upon entering, finds it to be an ever changing reality. The central hub room is that of a mysterious room with four doors and a sign labeled "Escape Your Cage". Based on Riley's actions, the player can interact with the room by collecting cans and throwing them at various things in each of the rooms, learning things about Gent, as well as revealing things about Riley's past.

It is revealed that Riley had an interest in drawing as a child, until one day her parents were killed in a car accident. This resulted in Riley drawing vicious and macabre things, among them being a killer car. Her work was eventually discovered by Joey Drew Studios who hired her, but later fired her when her work became too dark. This culminates in her malicious car manifesting and chasing Riley.

The game is full of Easter eggs and secrets, some of which hint at future games and updates. Riley can be attacked by the Ink Demon if she stands in one place for too long, destroys a certain number of Bendy cutouts, or on the PC version if the player holds the shift key and types K414. The game frequently updates. Several updates led to players being unable to enter the house as it had a condemned sign in front. This was later removed but readded as a condemned second house when walking backwards from the spawn location. Another update introduced a crudely made Bendy mascot costume that follows the player and whispers a distorted message. Playing it in reverse reveals that it is the lyrics to DAGames Bendy tribute song "Build Our Machine".

=== Bendy and the Ink Factory (TBA) ===
Bendy and the Ink Factory was revealed on August 27th, 2025 as the final installation of the Bendy Saga.

=== Spin-offs ===
==== Bendy in Nightmare Run (2018–2021), Bendy's Nightmare Run (2026) ====
A mobile spin-off, titled Bendy in Nightmare Run, was announced on January 26, 2018, and was released on iOS on August 15, 2018, and on Android on September 27. Developed by Karman Interactive and published by Joey Drew Studios Inc, the game introduces the cartoon versions of Bendy, Boris, and Alice Angel in an endless runner game, featuring four episodes with a different "boss" cartoon monster, as well as collectible items and 6 power-ups, including but not limited to bacon soup cans that act as a currency to buy abilities and upgrades. The game (previously discontinued) is now re-released with new content planned for 2026, now developed by Broken Circle Studios and re-named as Bendy's Nightmare Run. The game now remains in active development with 10 major planned updates and released on August 19, 2026.

==== Bendy and the Brine Barrel (2025) ====
A joke game released for 2025's April Fools on April 1st, only for Windows. The game is a remake of the original release of chapter one of Bendy and the Ink Machine, Moving Pictures, but with everything based around pickles. The game was downloadable from a subpage on the Joey Drew Studios website that was linked to by a QR code that was added to an update to Bendy: Secrets of the Machine and later removed at the end of April 1st.

== Animated shorts ==
Videos for a series of animated shorts based on the fictional works of the Joey Drew Studios company have been released on Crawford's Joey Drew Studios Inc. YouTube channel, with animation done by animator Timethehobo. The first animated short, "Tombstone Picnic", was released as part of the Chapter Three reveal trailer on August 11, 2017. The second short, "Haunted Hijinx", was uploaded on October 31, 2017, to celebrate Halloween. The third short, "Snow Sillies", was uploaded on December 24, 2017, in celebration of the holiday season. A second Christmas short, "Cookie Cookin", was uploaded on December 24, 2018, a year later after the release of "Snow Sillies". A fifth short, "Tasty Trio Troubles", was uploaded on February 10, 2019, in celebration of the game's second anniversary. "Hellfire Fighters", a short from the game, was uploaded on March 5, 2019. A seventh short, Cheap Seats, was uploaded on December 17, 2019. These shorts largely feature Bendy and Boris, with the Butcher Gang and Alice also appearing in the fifth and seventh shorts respectively.

One of Rooster Teeth's channels, ScrewAttack, pitted Bendy against Cuphead, the titular protagonist of the run and gun platformer Cuphead, in an animated fight on their web series, DBX, with Bendy emerging victorious.

=== Bendy shorts ===
No.	Title	Animation by	Written by	Original release date
1	"Tombstone Picnic"	TimetheHobo and WendyLiZard	theMeatly and Bookpast	August 11, 2017
2	"Haunted Hijinx"	TimetheHobo and WendyLiZard	theMeatly and Bookpast	October 31, 2017
3	"Snow Sillies"	TimetheHobo and WendyLiZard	theMeatly	December 24, 2017
4	"Cookie Cookin"	TimetheHobo and WendyLiZard	theMeatly and Bookpast	December 24, 2018
5	"Tasty Trio Troubles"	TimetheHobo, WendyLiZard and Connor Grail	theMeatly and Bookpast	February 10, 2019
6	"Hellfire Fighter"	TimetheHobo, WendyLiZard and Connor Grail	N/A	March 5, 2019
7	"Cheap Seats"	Punkett	theMeatly	December 17, 2019

=== Crossover with Cuphead ===
Title	Animation by	Written by	Original release date
Bendy Vs Cuphead	Javier Ulloa, Shelbie Copas and Chris Rudolph	Luis Cruz	December 22, 2018

=== Bendy: Nightmare Syndicate ===
An April Fool's Day joke released in 2026. It was a false trailer for a supposed game that saw Bendy teaming up with Huggy Wuggy from Poppy Playtime, Theodore Peterson from Hello Neighbor, Baldi from Baldi's Basics in Education and Learning, Baby Talking Tattletail from Tattletail, Freddy Fazbear from Five Nights at Freddy's, and Jumbo Josh from Garten of Banban. After the title reveal, it was followed by the message "April Fools".

== Books ==
=== Novels ===
==== Bendy and the Ink Machine: Dreams Come to Life ====
Bendy and the Ink Machine: Dreams Come to Life is a novel written by Adrienne Kress published by Scholastic on September 3, 2019. The novel centers on Daniel "Buddy" Lewek, a Jewish teenager who is hired by Joey Drew as a gofer and art apprentice at his studio. He becomes friends with a writer named Dot, and the two work together to piece together the many mysteries they come across in the studio, such as the ink and the increasingly erratic behavior from the music director, Sammy Lawrence. The book serves as a prequel to Bendy and the Ink Machine and Boris and the Dark Survival.

==== Bendy: The Illusion of Living ====
Bendy: The Illusion Of Living is the second novel in the Bendy franchise written by Adrienne Kress. The novel is based on the in-game memoir of the character, Joey Drew, the founder of Joey Drew Studios. The book is mainly told in the first-person by Joey Drew as he explains in detail about his life, his philosophy for creating animations, his techniques, and the creation of his animation studio and mascot, Bendy. The book also features comments from Nathan Arch, an old friend of Joey's who claimed the rights to the Bendy franchise in 1972 following Joey’s death the year prior. The book was published by Scholastic on February 2, 2021.

==== Bendy: The Lost Ones ====
Bendy: The Lost Ones is the third novel in the Bendy franchise to be written by Adrienne Kress. The novel is set shortly after the events of "Dreams Come to Life," taking place in Atlantic City in 1946, and follows three different protagonists with each perspective separated by chapters. First is William "Bill" Chambers, the teenage son of a rich and corrupt man who owns most of Atlantic City. Next is Constance Gray, the least popular of the Gray sisters and an inspiring scientist who suppresses her frustrations in order to appease others. Last is Brant Morris, a young reporter who is interested in befriending Bill to write a story about his father. The three meet on different occasions and become friends, but when Bill gets a job with the Gent Corporation and helps repair the Ink Machine, the trio become infected by the machine's ink in different ways. The novel was released on December 7, 2021, and published by Scholastic.

==== Bendy: Fade to Black ====
Bendy: Fade to Black is the fourth novel in the Bendy franchise to be written by Adrienne Kress. The story is set in 1953 and revolves around Rose Sorenson, a teenager from Brooklyn who gets a job as a personal assistant at the Kimset Production Studio in Manhattan. There she becomes friends with Joey Drew, who promotes her to his personal assistant for The Joey Drew Show. The show replays old Bendy cartoons and utilizes a special pair of 3D glasses in an experimental 3D television system. Joey makes her family one of his test families, and while the glasses work as intended Rose begins to see hallucinations and notices strange behavior from her younger brother. At the same time, many parts of Joey's past comes back to haunt him, and Rose gets caught in the middle of it. The book was publicly announced on Kress's personal Twitter account on January 11, 2023 and was published on October 3, 2023 by Scholastic.

=== Guides ===
==== Joey Drew Studios Employee Handbook ====
Joey Drew Studios Employee Handbook is a guide book written by Cala Spinner published by Scholastic on July 30, 2019. It goes over the five Bendy and the Ink Machine's chapters and most secrets throughout the game.

=== Comic strip collection ===
==== Bendy: Crack-Up Comics Collection ====
A compilation book of vintage-style Bendy comic strips, Crack-Up Comics Collection, is written by Vannotes and Mady Giuliani and were published by Scholastic on September 1, 2020.

=== Graphic novel ===
==== Bendy: Dreams Come to Life ====
On July 31, 2023, Kress announced on her personal Twitter account that her first Bendy novel, Bendy and the Ink Machine: Dreams Come to Life will be adapted into a graphic novel illustrated by Alex Arizmendi and adapted by Christopher Hastings with a proposed release in August 2024. On September 12, the cover was revealed on Kress's Twitter account depicting the Ink Demon, the franchise's main antagonist as he appears in Bendy and the Dark Revival. The book was leaked as a PDF on July 24, 2024 and later properly released on August 6, 2024.

== Cultural impact ==
=== Crossovers ===
A Halloween crossover mod, Hello Bendy, was released for the game on October 27, 2017, for a limited time, featuring the Hello Neighbor antagonist, who takes the role as Bendy in all previous three chapters and Sammy Lawrence for Chapter 2. The mod's menu features the advertisement of pre-ordering the game Hello Neighbor. The mod expired by the end of October that year.

Co-creator Mike Desjardins has also expressed interest in a crossover with Cuphead, which had also reached peak popularity around the same time as Bendy and the Ink Machine, the first game. Cuphead also makes use of a rubber hose style inspired by classic animation (e.g. Disney characters such as Mickey Mouse). On December 22, 2018, this crossover was achieved in animated form by Javier Ulloa, Shelbie Copas and Chris Rudolph, and was written by Luis Cruz.

== Upcoming projects ==
=== Potential television adaptation ===
In 2020, Derek Kolstad, creator of the John Wick franchise, stated that he has interest in making a television adaptation based on the Bendy and the Ink Machine game.

=== Film adaptation ===
==== Bendy and the Ink Machine ====
On Christmas Day 2023, it was officially announced that a film adaptation of the video game is in development with Radar Pictures involved. On Halloween 2024, André Øvredal (director of Trollhunter and Scary Stories to Tell in the Dark) was hired to direct the film, while another film company, Double Down Pictures, had joined development of the film.

=== Games ===
==== Bendy: The Cage ====
On Halloween, October 31, 2023, a trailer for a new installment in the series titled Bendy: The Cage was revealed. This game will take place before and during the events of Bendy and the Dark Revival, and will center around Henry Stein as he plans to escape The Pit, a hellscape of metal and blood where only the darkest souls reside, after having been imprisoned by the Keepers. Only a few teasers have been released. The first teaser, which shows off Henry, his axe, and the plot of the game. Another small teaser shows the player (presumably Henry) holding an axe while staring at an unknown enemy that looks similar to a Lost One, only with blood splattered all over it, a cartoon glove for one of its hands and a beartrap-like contraption on its head. The screenshot also has secret text on it saying, "THE COMPOSER RETURNS", implying Sammy Lawrence's return in the game. A post from Crawford confirmed Sammy Lawrence's return. On April 14, 2025, Crawford announced that the development of the game had been put on hold with much of its content repurposed for Bendy and the Ink Factory (then B3NDY). It was then announced on October 31, 2025, the game was back in development with it now being a third person survival horror instead of first person and with a new release window of 2026. Crawford has stated that Bendy: The Cage will be an M-rated game, more focused on psychological horror, blood, violence, and existential dread.

==== Bendy: The Silent City ====
On May 10, 2023, prototype footage of a first-person shooter game titled Bendy: The Silent City was accidentally uploaded publicly onto the Joey Drew Studios YouTube channel, before it was quickly privatized and deleted. Crawford said on Twitter that the game was not in active development, as the team were developing other Bendy projects at the time, but that the game was not cancelled.

On January 1, 2024, Crawford addressed the game, saying that further development was made on the game since the leak, but was still considered a low priority game and a long way off from being released.

A teaser for the game was included in Bendy: Secrets of the Machine, released on April 14, 2024. The teaser includes a photo of a gun, with "Alice II" written on it.

==== Bendy's Rubberhose Revenge ====
Leaked sometime in May 2024 with its trademark, nothing is known about this project apart from its name and that it will probably star Bendy since the developers have not acknowledged the game in any fashion.

==== Bendy and the Ink Factory ====
On April 14, 2024, the third and final mainline Bendy game was teased in Bendy: Secrets of the Machine, with the working title B3NDY. The game was formally announced on April 18, 2024. Its title was revealed on August 27, 2025.
