= Toro (magazine) =

- Cover of May 2004 issue with Mía Maestro
- Editor: Derek Finkle
- Categories: Men's
- Founded: 2002
- Final issue: 2007
- Country: Canada
- Language: English
- Website: www.toromagazine.com
- ISSN: 1709-1314

Toro was a Canadian men's magazine. It was named by its owner, Christopher Bratty. The editorial was overseen by Derek Finkle. Cameron Williamson and Alicia Kowalewski were the creative and art directors, respectively.

== Brand lineage ==
In 2003, TORO magazine entered into the Canadian marketplace as a glossy men's lifestyle publication, distributed by The Globe and Mail as well as by subscription and newsstand. During its four-year run, TORO garnered more than 60 National Magazine Award nominations. In 2007, TORO magazine suspended publication.

A web-only version of TORO launched in May 2008, co-founded by Christopher Bratty and William Morassutti, the founding editor. The digital TORO reached a peak monthly readership of 543,000 unique visitors in October, 2010 (ComScore/October, 2010) and operated for five years, until 2013, at which point publication was suspended.

== Print covers ==
- Sam Roberts (April/May 2003)
- Donald Sutherland (June/July 2003)
- Ryan Gosling (August/September 2003)
- Estella Warren (October/November 2003)
- Melissa Auf der Maur (Winter 2003)
- Jessica Paré (April 2004)
- Barry Pepper (March 2004)
- Ryan Reynolds (Winter 2004)
- Rachel Blanchard (September 2004)
- Dita Von Teese (October 2004)
- Jesse Palmer (November 2004)
- Daniel Igali (Summer 2004)
- David Cronenberg (Summer 2004)
- Sofía Vergara (October 2005)
- Steve Nash (November 2005)
- Elisha Cuthbert (May 2005)
- Kristin Kreuk (Summer 2005)
- Scott Speedman (April 2005)
- Wilmer Valderrama (Winter 2005)
- Paul Walker (March 2006)
- Gretchen Mol (April 2006)
- Mía Maestro (May 2006)
- Jason Bay (Summer 2006)
- Elizabeth Banks (September 2006)
- John Cena (October 2006)
- Ricky Williams (November 2006)
- Beau Garrett (Winter 2006)
- Hayden Christensen (March 2007)

== Print Talking To's ==
- Rick Marin (April/May 2003)
- Gord Downie (June/July 2003)
- Bryan Adams (August/September 2003)
- Phil Esposito (October/November 2003)
- David Bowie (Winter 2003)
- Éric Gagné (April 2004)
- Ed Robertson, Mia Kirshner (March 2004)
- Chandra West (Winter 2004)
- Jessalyn Gilsig (September 2004)
- Brian Wilson (October 2004)
- Tricia Helfer (May 2004)
- Julie Delpy, Solitair, Ivana Santilli, Mitchie Mee, Buck 65, Kyprios, Graph Noble, Abs&Fase (Summer 2004)
- Ashley Scott (September 2005)
- Sheryl Crow, Jay Baruchel, Tom Green, Will Arnett (October 2005)
- Franz Ferdinand, Maggie Grace, Benz Antoine (November 2005)
- Paul Haggis (May 2005)
- Kate Pierson, Justin Chatwin (May 2005)
- Joel Plaskett, The Stills, The Dears, Arcade Fire, Melissa George (April 2005)
- Emilie de Ravin (March 2006)
- The Streets (May 2006)
- MSTRKRFT, Josh Dean, Leslie Bibb (Summer 2006)
- John Lithgow, Justin Timberlake, Emily Haines, Sarah Carter (October 2006)
- Gordon Moakes (March 2007)

== Print TORO Woman ==
- Joanne Kelly (April/May 2003)
- Esthero (June/July 2003)
- Sarah Polley (August/September 2003)
- Kristin Booth (October/November 2003)
- Caroline Dhavernas (Winter 2003)
- Lindy Booth (April 2004)
- Feist (March 2004)
- Erica Durance (Winter 2004)
- Melyssa Ford (September 2004)
- Tamara Hope (October 2004)
- Evelyn Ng (November 2004)
- Tanya Reid (May 2004)
- Françoise Yip (Summer 2004)
- Katheryn Winnick (September 2005)
- Kristin Adams (October 2005)
- Sarah Carter (November 2005)
- Karen Cliche (May 2005)
- Cobie Smulders (Summer 2005)
- Emily Van Camp (April 2005)
- Gina Holden (March 2006)
- Tania Saulnier (April 2006)
- Vanessa Lengies, Peregrym (May 2006)
- Michelle Lombardo (Summer 2006)
- Natassia Malthe (September 2006)
- Shelby Fenner (October 2006)
- Crystal Lowe (Winter 2006)
- Brooke Nevin (March 2007)

== Web TORO Woman ==
- Adrienne Kress (January 2009)
