= Poppy Playtime =

2021 episodic survival horror video game

- Thumbnail for Chapter 1
- Developer: Mob Entertainment (Note: Formerly known as MOB Games)
- Publisher: Mob Entertainment
- Directors: Bryce Clark; Isaac Christopherson
- Producers: Kristina Hearen; Dana Willoughby; Joshua Morris; Adam Uhlenbrock; Drake Vogl; Zach Belanger
- Programmers: Achebe Spencer; Ben Pavlovits
- Artists: Sky Flygare; Nick Heltne
- Writers: Ben Rooker; Eric True; Micah Preciado; Zachary Preciado; Isaac Christopherson; Zach Belanger; Seth Belanger; Andy Gill; Malakai Breckenridge
- Composers: Zachary Preciado (Chapters 1–3); Blake Butler (Chapter 3); Ben Rooker (Chapter 4-5); Elijah Delaney (Chapter 4); Lance Montgomery (Chapter 5)
- Engine: Unreal Engine 4 (Chapter 1–2); Unreal Engine 5 (Chapter 3–5)
- Platforms: Windows; Android; iOS; PlayStation 4; PlayStation 5; Nintendo Switch; Nintendo Switch 2; Xbox One; Xbox Series X/S
- Release: Chapter 1: Windows; October 13, 2021; Android, iOS; March 11, 2022; PS4, PS5; NA/JP: December 20, 2023; EU: January 15, 2024; Switch; NA/JP: December 25, 2023; EU: January 15, 2024; AU: January 16, 2024; Xbox One, Xbox Series X/S: July 12, 2024; Chapter 2: Windows; May 5, 2022; Android, iOS; August 15, 2022; PS4, PS5, Xbox One, Xbox Series X/S; September 20, 2024; Switch; October 31, 2024; Chapter 3: Windows; January 30, 2024; PS4, PS5, Xbox One, Xbox Series X/S; September 20, 2024; Android, IOS; November 14, 2024; Switch; October 31, 2024; Chapter 4: Windows; January 30, 2025; PS4, PS5, Xbox One, Xbox Series X/S, Switch, Switch 2; June 25, 2025; Android, IOS; July 16, 2025; Chapter 5: Windows; February 18, 2026; PS4, PS5, Xbox One, Xbox Series X/S, Switch, Switch 2; May 27, 2026; Android; November 5, 2026; iOS; November 7, 2026
- Genres: Puzzle; Horror
- Mode: Single-player

Poppy Playtime is an episodic puzzle survival horror video game series first developed and published in October 2021 by American indie developer Mob Entertainment. The game is set in an abandoned factory owned by the fictional toy company Playtime Co. The player controls a former employee who receives a letter inviting them back to the factory years after the company's staff disappeared without a trace.

The first chapter was released for Windows on October 12, 2021, and later ported to Android and iOS on March 11, 2022, the PlayStation 4 and PlayStation 5 on December 20, 2023, the Nintendo Switch on December 25, and the Xbox One and Xbox Series X/S on July 12, 2024. The second chapter was released for Windows on May 5, 2022, and the PlayStation 4 and 5, the Xbox One and Xbox Series X/S on September 20, 2024. The third chapter was released on Windows in January 2024, and the PlayStation 4 and 5, the Xbox One and Xbox Series X/S on September 20, 2024. The fourth chapter was released on Windows on January 30, 2025. The fifth chapter released on February 18, 2026 for Windows. All chapters after the first are premium downloadable content.

Poppy Playtime has garnered a positive reception for its atmosphere, story, and gameplay, although it has also been criticized for having numerous bugs. The game faced several controversies, including its aesthetics and character design's similarities to that of children-oriented media, resulting in popularity among young demographics. The announcement of in-game non-fungible token content in December 2021 received harsh criticism, resulting in the developers donating all profits from the tokens to charity.

== Gameplay ==
Poppy Playtime is a first person survival-horror video game where the player plays as an unnamed ex-employee of a toy-making company named Playtime Co., who returns to the company's abandoned toy factory after its staff mysteriously disappeared a decade earlier. There, they discover that the factory is filled with monstrous toys who are alive and malicious towards them, and starts looking for a way to escape the premises.

The game features multiple puzzles throughout, which the player must solve in order to progress further, with some requiring a gadget named the GrabPack, a backpack that can be equipped with two extendable hands which can be used to pull and reach objects from a far distance, conduct electricity, and access certain doors. In Chapter 2, it can also be used to swing across gaps and, with a green hand obtained during gameplay, transfer electricity between sources. In Chapter 3, the player obtains an improved version of the GrabPack, the GrabPack 2.0, that comes with longer wires, jet boosters to enable falling safely from great heights, and the ability to switch the green hand with a purple hand that allows them to jump long distances and an orange finger gun hand that doubles as a flare gun. They also acquire a gas mask to help them navigate areas exposed to the dangerous "Red Smoke". After the player kills Dr. Harley Sawyer in Chapter 4, they obtain his Omni-Chip and use it to upgrade another Red Hand into the Omni-Hand at a terminal in his lair. This hand can only be used up to four times and unlocks high-security level doors throughout the factory. When Huggy Wuggy destroyed the player's GrabPack 2.0 early in Chapter 5, the player retrieves an old GrabPack 2.0 from Bron the Dinosaur in the Boilers area. This GrabPack comes with two new functional hands: The Pressure Hand and the Conductive Hand. In addition, players can find various VHS tapes throughout the factory that give a more in-depth explanation of the story.

== Plot ==
=== Chapter 1: A Tight Squeeze (2021) ===
EVERYONE THINKS THE STAFF DISSAPEARED 10 YEARS AGO.

WER'E STILL HERE.

FIND THE FLOWER

— Letter received by the employee

In 2005, 10 years after the shutdown of a toy production company called Playtime Co., an unnamed former employee receives a package containing a VHS tape advertising the company's Poppy Playtime doll and tours of their toy factory before abruptly cutting to spliced-in footage of graffiti depicting a poppy flower and a vague letter requesting them to "find the flower". After watching the tape, the employee complies and returns to the toy factory to do so.

Arriving at the long-abandoned factory's lobby, the employee encounters what appears to be a giant statue of a Playtime Co. toy called Huggy Wuggy before the power goes out. Though the employee restores it, they find that the Huggy 'statue' has disappeared. Progressing deeper into the factory, Huggy emerges from a hallway and chases them in the vents before they send him falling to his apparent death at the bottom of the factory. Soon enough, the employee finds the graffiti, which leads to a room containing a Poppy Playtime doll inside a glass case. Upon unlocking it, Poppy acknowledges them before the employee passes out.

=== Chapter 2: Fly in a Web (2022) ===
Sometime later, the employee awakens to find Poppy gone and the halls leading to the front of the factory blocked. While exploring the factory's rear halls, the employee eventually locates Playtime founder Elliot Ludwig's office. There, they once again encounter Poppy, who thanks them for freeing her and offers to help them escape by providing the activation code for the factory's train. However, she is grabbed and pulled deeper into the factory.

As the employee approaches the Game Station and the train, they encounter a giant spider-like monster called Mommy Long Legs, who reveals that she is holding Poppy hostage and challenges the player to win three games in the Game Station in exchange for the train's code, threatening to eat them alive if they break the rules. While proceeding through the Game Station, they successfully complete the first two games, obtain two-thirds of the train code, and briefly encounter Huggy's friendly female counterpart, Kissy Missy. During the third game, however, the employee is forced to escape into subterranean tunnels upon realizing that Mommy intentionally rigged it to ensure their demise. An enraged Mommy accuses them of cheating and, in a frenzied state, pursues them back into the factory until her arm gets caught in an industrial grinder which the employee activates, killing her in the process. Immediately after, a large needle-fingered hand belonging to an experiment named the Prototype collects what remains intact of her body.

The employee rescues Poppy, obtains the rest of the train code, and nearly escapes. However, Poppy diverts the train, refusing to let them leave, stating she requires their help. Before she can explain further, her communications are cut off and the train runs out of control, derailing near a sign pointing to "Playcare", knocking the employee unconscious.

=== Chapter 3: Deep Sleep (2024) ===
The employee reawakens as a giant cat-like monster called CatNap throws them into a trash compactor. However, they escape and head to Playtime's on-site orphanage, Playcare. Along the way, they find a factory phone and receive advice from a voice referring to himself as "Ollie", who warns them that CatNap, Playcare's guardian and a fanatically loyal disciple of the Prototype, will try to kill them. On Ollie's instructions, the employee attempts to reroute power from Playcare's many facilities to power the Gas Production Zone and divert a hallucinogenic gas called the "Red Smoke", which CatNap can produce.

All throughout, they re-encounter Kissy and reunite with Poppy, who explains she needs their help to kill the Prototype and end his control over the factory, warning them that the Prototype is aware of their presence and will kill them if they try to escape. After killing a hostile teacher named Miss Delight, the employee eventually encounters DogDay - a dog-like monster said to be the last of the "Smiling Critters". He warns the employee of the presence of small creatures intending to gradually consume them internally, further stating that CatNap mutilated him for defying the Prototype - whom CatNap worships as a god. As DogDay warns the employee to leave, a swarm of Mini Smiling Critters appear and burrow into him, taking control of his body and mounting a failed attempt at killing the employee. Following an attack by CatNap, the employee experiences a hallucination wherein Poppy asks about their knowledge of Playtime's "Bigger Bodies Initiative", a project that saw the company experiment on orphans and turned them into the monsters they have encountered. The employee eventually defeats CatNap before he offers himself as a sacrifice to the Prototype, who stabs CatNap in the head and takes his body.

After successfully redirecting the Red Smoke, Poppy reveals to the employee footage of the "Hour of Joy", wherein the Prototype ordered Playtime's monsters to slaughter the employees indiscriminately ten years prior. Reiterating their mission to kill the Prototype, Poppy leads the employee onto a lift to make their descent towards the Prototype's lair, intending to send it back up for Kissy. On the way down however, Poppy and the employee hear something attack Kissy and frantically attempt to send the lift back up, but the hatch closes on them.

=== Chapter 4: Safe Haven (2025) ===
Poppy drops off the employee at the bottom of the lift while she goes back up for Kissy. Ending up at an underground prison, they make their way inside. Ollie tries to contact them, but encounters significant interference, while a computer program called the Doctor discovers them and sends Yarnaby, a leonine monster loyal to him, to hunt the employee. Nonetheless, they receive help in escaping from a clay-like monster and ally of Poppy called Doey the Doughman, who guides them to the "Safe Haven", a repurposed security room sheltering several non-violent toys.

Along the way, they reunite with Poppy and an injured Kissy and narrowly elude the Prototype. Once they are safe, Poppy reveals that the orphans are still alive and sleeping in the Prototype's lair. Hoping to kill him and save them simultaneously, Poppy intends to detonate the Red Smoke, which the employee redirected into the factory's foundation, with old mining charges. To facilitate this, the employee works with Doey, who reveals that the Doctor is Dr. Harley Sawyer, a Playtime Co. scientist aligned with the Prototype who created the company's monsters. Doey tasks the employee to retrieve the Doctor’s "Omni-Hand", an Executive Level master key that allows him to control everything in the factory except the Safe Haven, to repair the Safe Haven's failing generator and a required tool for Poppy's plans. While pursuing the employee, Yarnaby is snagged by a chain and falls into a pit of molten slag, killing him. As the employee works to weaken the Doctor, he questions their motives for returning to Playtime Co. and claims Poppy is no better than the Prototype, revealing that she had a hand in the Hour of Joy, before eventually trapping them in his computer core. The employee escapes and overloads the Doctor's systems, deactivating him in the process.

The employee makes it back to the Safe Haven with the Omni-Hand, but the power goes out and Ollie, now able to contact the group, warns them the Prototype is right outside the Safe Haven. Poppy tasks Doey with distracting the Prototype and the employee with fixing the Safe Haven's generator with Ollie's help and planting the explosives in the foundation while she protects the Safe Haven's inhabitants. The employee seemingly completes their tasks successfully, though the reality is that Ollie led Doey away from the Safe Haven and tricked the employee into rigging the generator to overheat and explode, destroying the Safe Haven and killing most of its inhabitants. An incensed Doey blames the employee for the disaster, takes on a monstrous form, and attacks them. Unable to reason with Doey or calm him down, the employee flees to an underground construction site, where they use liquid nitrogen canisters, industrial saws, and a tunnel boring machine to kill Doey, who tearfully apologizes for his actions twice before presumably dying.

While searching for survivors, they reconvene with Poppy and Kissy in a ventilation block. Poppy confronts the employee for killing Doey before Ollie contacts the group, revealing himself as the Prototype. He states that the real Ollie has been gone for years and that he has stolen the explosives from the foundation, before speaking to Poppy directly, declaring that it is time for her to "come home". Fearing that the Prototype will put her back in her case, Poppy flees into the air ducts, abandoning Kissy and the employee before the ground collapses from the Prototype detonating the explosives in an attempt to kill them. Kissy grabs them but fails to save them, losing an arm in the process. The employee survives the fall but gets trapped in the factory's underground laboratory, where Huggy, having survived his own fall, arrives and, recognizing the employee, viciously tries to break in as the Red Smoke fills the room.

=== Chapter 5: Broken Things (2026) ===
Huggy breaks into the room and pursues the employee, who escapes deeper into the labs at the cost of their Grab-Pack. They eventually encounter Giblet, a kindhearted toy and friend of Poppy's, who helps them obtain a new Grab-Pack. Giblet then introduces the employee to his friend Chum Chompkins, a kindly stomach-mouthed monster who has been working as a double agent in the Prototype's ranks, and works with him and Giblet to reach the server room to locate a backup containing the Prototype's weakness. Along the way, the employee gets separated from Giblet and Chum, has to escape Huggy again, and is kidnapped by Lily Lovebraids, an insane doll with prehensile hair whom the Prototype kept isolated from the rest of the factory. Lily coerces the employee into helping with the preparations for her makeshift tea party, but they reunite with Kissy and Poppy, whom she also captured. Following a failed escape attempt, the trio are forced into the party as the Prototype (who is revealed to be a massive jester/arachnid hybrid) arrives and announces that the orphans are already in a "Better Place." Poppy interprets this statement as the orphans having been murdered by the Prototype, and she becomes furious with him and denounces him as a "monster." Angered by Poppy's rebellion, he squeezes her porcelain head and accidentally cracks it, disfiguring her before Kissy attacks him and escapes with her. Meanwhile, the employee is pursued by an enraged Lily, whom they kill by dropping a large platform on her.

Reconvening with Giblet, Kissy, and Poppy, the employee joins them in heading to a tram leading to the server room. Huggy returns for a third time and nearly kills the employee, but Kissy pacifies him before the Prototype ambushes and impales them both, presumably killing them. The Prototype then chases the employee onto the tram, which Giblet and Poppy crash in a desperate attempt to kill the Prototype while they and the employee jump to safety. The Prototype survives the crash, fatally impales the employee and drops them into a vat of "poppy gel" (a growth medium with regenerative capabilities) in attempt to drown the employee before kidnapping Poppy. Fortunately, Giblet rescues and revives the now severely physically weakened employee and guides them to the server room to activate the backup in order to defeat the Prototype and save Poppy, which they learn is the Doctor, who ominously greets the employee after being revived.

== Characters ==
- The Employee (The Player): An unnamed former employee of Playtime Co. who returns to the abandoned toy factory after the company's staff mysteriously disappeared a decade ago.
- Elliot Ludwig (voiced by Tom Schalk): The mysterious late founder of Playtime Co., who sought to make children happy with his toys. He was also the creator of the "poppy gel", a substance with regenerative properties.
- Leith Pierre (voiced by Robin Nelson): Elliot Ludwig's cold, arrogant and unscrupulous successor who took part in the company's "Bigger Bodies Initiative".
- Stella Greyber (voiced by Nola Klop): Playtime Co.'s head of Playcare who was responsible for organizing orphans' testing forms.
- Edward "Eddie" M. N. Ritterman (voiced by Christopher Tester): Playtime Co.'s reclusive and ruthless head of research who ensured the company's illegal experiments remained secret.
- The Warden (voiced by Romulo Bernal): Playtime Co.'s prison warden and one of Playtime's Executives.
- Experiment 1006 / The Prototype: A rogue experiment created as a precursor to Poppy and the main antagonist of the series capable of mimicking others' voices. On August 8, 1995, he took control of the company's monsters and enacted a massacre of their employees in an event that would later be dubbed the "Hour of Joy". In later chapters, he is revealed to have been created from the adopted son of Elliot Ludwig, Oliver (voiced by Reid Osiecki in Chapter 3, Jonna-Lynn Alonso in Chapter 4, and Amanda Hufford in Chapter 5).
- Experiment 1007 / Poppy (voiced by Nola Klop): A sentient doll based on the first toy created by Playtime Co. who seeks to defeat the Prototype. In later chapters, she is revealed to have been created from Poppy Ludwig, the deceased daughter of Elliot Ludwig and adopted sister of Ollie.
- Experiment 1170 / Huggy Wuggy: A plush monster with long limbs based on Playtime Co.'s most successful and memorable toy.
- Experiment 1222 / Mommy Long Legs (voiced by Elsie Lovelock): A spider-like monster with an elastic neck and limbs that Playtime Co. created from an orphan named Marie Payne.
- Experiment 1176 / Bunzo Bunny: A rabbit monster holding two cymbals.
- Experiment 1172 / Kissy Missy: A friendlier female counterpart to Huggy Wuggy who assists Poppy and the employee in their efforts to stop the Prototype.
- Experiment 1174 / PJ Pug-a-Pillar: A pug/caterpillar hybrid monster based on Playtime Co.'s "Swap-imals" toy line.
- Experiment 1188 / CatNap: A cat-like monster based on a recalled member of Playtime Co.'s "Smiling Critters" line of scented plush animal dolls who can produce a hallucinogenic gas called the "Red Smoke". Originally an orphan named Theodore Grambell, he was electrocuted while attempting to escape Playtime Co.'s onsite orphanage, Playcare, but was saved by the Prototype. Ever since, CatNap has worshiped him as a god.
- Miss Delight (voiced by Avalon Delaney): A humanoid teacher doll trapped in Playcare's on-site school and the last of a series of Miss Delights, whom she cannibalized to survive.
- DogDay (voiced by Baldwin Williams Jr.): A dog-like monster based on a member of Playtime Co.'s "Smiling Critters" line who CatNap mutilated for defying the Prototype.
- Experiment 1160 / Boxy Boo: A jack-in-the-box-like monster and the first successful monster that Harley Sawyer created, who serves as the company's executioner and first appears in the spin-off Project: Playtime.
- Experiment 1354 / The Doctor (voiced by Baldwin Williams Jr.): A Playtime Co. scientist named Harley Sawyer, who conceived the "Bigger Bodies Initiative", oversaw the creation of the company's monsters, and first appears in Project: Playtime. Following the "Theater Incident", where nearly 70 tourists and 12 factory employees were killed due to his negligence, his superiors forcibly uploaded his mind into Playtime Co.'s computer systems. Nonetheless, he is able to remotely operate a series of robots to interact with the physical world.
- Experiment 1166 / Yarnaby: A leonine monster loyal to the Doctor created from an orphan named Quinn Navidson. Unlike the other experiments, who fear and despise the Doctor for his actions, Yarnaby admires him due to a father-son bond the pair developed amidst the experimentation.
- Experiment 1322 / Doey the Doughman (voiced by Michael Kovach): An amorphous, mentally unstable clay-like creature who was created from Jack Ayers, a young boy who accidentally fell into a vat of clay while visiting the Playtime factory, and two orphans, the compassionate Matthew Hallard and the aggressive Kevin Barnes.
- Experiment 1163 / Pianosaurus (voiced by Alex Rochon): A green dinosaur toy with piano keys for teeth who was deemed a failure for his heightened aggression and low intelligence.
- Experiment 1468 / Lily Lovebraids (voiced by Nicole Tompkins): A humanoid doll who is able to move her hair at will and stretch it long distances. She was created from a Playtime Co. counselor named Gracie Green (also played by Tompkins), who was involved in brainwashing the orphans selected for the Bigger Bodies Initiative.
- Experiment 1202 / Giblet (voiced by Elliot "Eli" Schiff): A creature who resides in the labs and assists the employee in their efforts to stop the Prototype.
- Chum Chompkins: A mute plump furry creature whose mouth is located in his stomach and assists Giblet by serving as a double agent in the Prototype's ranks.

== Development and release ==
Poppy Playtime release timeline
2021	Chapter 1 – A Tight Squeeze
2022	Chapter 1 iOS and Android release
2022	Chapter 2 – Fly in a Web
2022	Chapter 2 iOS and Android release
2022	Spin-off - Project Playtime
2023	Chapter 1 Console release
2024	Chapter 3 – Deep Sleep
2024	Chapter 2 and 3 Console Release
2024	Chapter 3 iOS and Android release
2025	Chapter 4 – Safe Haven
2025	Chapter 4 Console Release
2025	Chapter 4 iOS and Android release
2026	Chapter 5 – Broken Things
2026	Chapter 5 Console Release
2026	Chapter 5 iOS and Android release

Originally starting out as a Kickstarter campaign, the idea of Poppy Playtime was originally thought of by game director Isaac Christopherson, stating that people called most indie horror games "walking simulators", giving Mob Entertainment the idea to "create something with gameplay that doesn't feel quite so run-of-the-mill, while still staying exciting, terrifying, and unique". In an interview with The New York Times, Zach Belanger stated that his idea behind Huggy Wuggy was to "create something entirely new", and that his technique of making him terrifying was by making him larger than everything on screen. A trailer for the game's first chapter was uploaded in September 2021.

The first chapter was released for Windows on October 12, and later for Android and iOS on March 11, 2022. After the first chapter's release, official merchandise of the game began being released, including T-shirts, posters and plush toys, as well as official collectibles produced by Youtooz. The first chapter would later be released for the PlayStation 4 and PlayStation 5 on December 20, 2023, and for the Nintendo Switch on December 25. It was released onto Xbox One and Xbox Series S/X on July 12, 2024.

All chapters after the first are available as premium downloadable content. A trailer for Chapter 2, titled Fly in a Web, was released on February 22, 2022, with several teasers later being posted to Twitter, including a teaser trailer on April 9. In preparation of the second chapter's release, the first chapter was made free. The second chapter was then released on May 5, for Microsoft Windows and then on August 15, for iOS and Android and is estimated to be three times as long as the first chapter. Two teaser trailers for Chapter 3 were released on July 26, 2022, and August 6, 2022, respectively, with a slated release date of winter 2023. However, the chapter was delayed "several additional weeks into 2024" after several developers left Mob Entertainment due to "creative differences". Chapter 3 released on January 30, 2024, on Steam. Chapter 2 and Chapter 3 were released to the PlayStation 4, PlayStation 5, Xbox One, and the Xbox Series X/S on September 20, 2024. Mob Entertainment announced Chapter 4 on their YouTube channel with a slated release date of January 30, 2025. Chapter 5: Broken Things, according to Christopherson, was planned to serve as the game’s final chapter. Senior director George Krstic stated that while they saw potential to end the series there, it eventually evolved into a “major turning point”. Christopherson did not fault Mob Entertainment for changing his original story outline, as he acknowledged that it was short and needed fleshing out.

== Reception ==
Poppy Playtime also quickly gained exposure on platforms such as YouTube and Twitch, with videos on the former reaching millions of views, as well as games based on Poppy Playtime appearing on Roblox. The game is considered part of the so-called "mascot horror" subgenre, which rose in popularity during 2014 with the initial release of Five Nights at Freddy's. It was nominated for the "Most Stream-friendly Game" award at the 2022 Indie Live Expo Awards in Japan.

=== Critical response ===
Aggregate review scores
Game	Metacritic
A Tight Squeeze	N/A
Fly in a Web	N/A
Deep Sleep	N/A
Safe Haven	N/A
Broken Things	(PC) 74/100 (Note: Based on 8 reviews) (PS5) 76/100 (Note: Based on 4 reviews)

Poppy Playtime was well-received upon release, with praise for its atmosphere, story, and character design; some considered the game's short length contributed to its popularity. The game has been compared to the Five Nights at Freddy's and Bendy franchises, with Screen Rant's Austin Geiger calling Poppy Playtime "more engaging" than Five Nights at Freddy's: Security Breach. Chapter 2 received mixed reviews, praised for voice acting and ending, but criticized for bugs and performance issues. Mob Entertainment issued an apology and rolled out patches.

Chapter 3 was generally positively received. Danielle Rose of PCGamesN, calling it an "enjoyable and emotional horror puzzle game" with a strong conclusion, praising mechanics and final level, but criticizing technical bugs, difficulty spikes, and pacing. Tilly Lawton of Pocket Tactics, calling it near-perfect post-launch, highlighting enemies, puzzles, lore, and presentation, while noting launch bugs.

Chapter 4 received generally positive reviews. Melissa Sarnowski of Screen Rant rated it 8/10, praising suspense, puzzles, and story, while noting stuttering, bugs, and some bland chases. Carles Font of Gamereactor, praising atmosphere, art, sound, and story, while criticizing gameplay innovation, repetitive puzzles, and persistent bugs. Tilly Lawton of Pocket Tactics, praising dark narrative, characters, and horror, but noting bugs, performance issues, and less engaging chases.

According to review aggregate website Metacritic, Chapter 5 received "mixed or average" reviews on PC, and "generally favorable" on PlayStation 5. Tilly Lawton of Pocket Tactics, praising fresh mechanics, thoughtful puzzles, engaging narrative, polished gameplay, and cliffhanger. Ramón Varela of Vandal, highlighting more varied and elaborate puzzles, immersive atmosphere, and collectables, but noting predictability, lack of genuine horror, and short length. Alfredo Pavez of Gamereactor Spain, praising its puzzle variety and atmosphere, but criticizing its short length, some predictable moments, and inconsistent platforming, feeling that the finale doesn't fully live up to the hype. Tyler Nethers of Gaming Age, calling it "just fine" but warning that future entries would need substantial changes.

=== Controversies ===
In December 2021, on Twitter, the developers announced non-fungible tokens of the in-game posters, which was quickly met with backlash and negative reviews from the community, as well as some users requesting refunds, arguing that the developers put lore of the game behind a paywall. In response, the developers deleted the announcement but were unable to remove the NFTs as well due to a contract they had signed, stating that they have to wait for it to expire. On May 3, 2022, Mob Entertainment CEO Zach Belanger posted a statement on Twitter where he confirms that all profits earned from the NFTs would be going to the Clean Air Task Force organization.

Around Poppy Playtime's release, developer Ekrcoaster claimed that Mob Entertainment plagiarized his game Venge. In the aforementioned statement, Belanger denied the allegations, stating that there was no intent to plagiarize.

Dorset Police in England and the Lafayette County, Wisconsin Sheriff's Department both released a statement to parents regarding the character Huggy Wuggy on March 22, 2022, and April 7, respectively, claiming that due to the character's name, various videos were not being blocked by "firewalls" and filtered by parental filters on various platforms, including TikTok and YouTube Kids. The former also claimed that various schools in the United Kingdom reported children recreating a game where one child hugs another and then whispers sinister things into the recipient's ear. It was also reported that a child had attempted to jump out of a window to mimic the character, and that Luxemburg-Casco School District had received complaints from students claiming they could not sleep due to the character. Similarly, a primary school in Adelaide also warned parents about the game, specifically adaptations of it and violent songs featuring the character. Fact-checking website Snopes confirmed that while there had been reports from parents within the United Kingdom, the police had incorrectly claimed that the character sang songs, despite said songs being fan-made and not appearing in-game (the most notable of which was the viral music video "Free Hugs" by Igor "TryHardNinja" Gordienko.) Snopes had also said that inappropriate videos involving the character were not available for younger users on TikTok and YouTube Kids, with spokespersons for each platform confirming so. Belanger also commented on the situation, calling the warnings "completely untrue and/or grossly exaggerated".

In September 2022, El Observador reported that seven children at a school in Uruguay played a game based on Poppy Playtime that instructed them to commit self-harm using pencil sharpeners, with two being hospitalized as a result. The president of the Institute of Children and Adolescents of Uruguay, Pablo Abdala, states that the incident "confirms that technological development entails a very severe risk".

=== Legacy ===
The game has since inspired multiple mascot horror games, including the creation of the 2023 video game Garten of Banban, which features similar gameplay.

== Spin-offs and other media ==
=== Games ===
==== Project: Playtime ====
On October 31, 2022, Project: Playtime, a free-to-play co-op horror prequel spin-off, was announced and later released as early access on Steam on December 12, 2022, missing its original set date of December 6, due to "server backend issues". Six players are assigned as Survivors while another player is given the role of the Monster, which can either be Huggy Wuggy, Mommy Long Legs, or a jack-in-the-box-themed character, Boxy Boo. Players are tasked with retrieving toy parts in order to assemble a large toy, while the Monster is tasked with finding and killing the Players. In late July 2026, it was announced that the developers, Mob Entertainment, were ending support for Project: Playtime later in the year.

==== Poppy Playtime: Forever ====
Poppy Playtime: Forever is a game developed by Mob Entertainment and Jazwares and was released on February 29, 2024, on the Roblox platform. The game allows up to 10 players per server and has a built-in level editor, allowing players to make their own levels.

==== Escape From Playtime ====
On August 26, 2026, Mob Entertainment announced Escape From Playtime, another co-op game taking place in the timeline of Poppy Playtime. In it, players, whenever they play solo or work together as an eight-member group, take the role of mini Smiling Critter experiments who must navigate the Playtime Co. factory where they are tasked to scavenge material for a building project that promises them freedom while they solve puzzles and avoid getting attacked by the factory’s lurking monsters. Escape from Playtime released on Steam Early Access on October 21, 2026.

=== Film adaptation ===
In April 2022, Mob Entertainment partnered with Studio71 to produce a film adaptation of the video game. They reportedly sought to bring Roy Lee into the project. The live-action feature will be co-produced and developed by Legendary Entertainment and Angry Films' Don Murphy and Susan Montford, as announced in May 2024.

=== Merchandise ===
By November 2021, counterfeit or unlicensed Huggy Wuggy plush toys were highly in demand with toy sellers worldwide, with official merchandise made available five months after the game's release. The popularity of such toys has been fueled by demand from children who encountered the character on YouTube. In November 2022, the sale of the Huggy Wuggy plush toys was banned by the Turkish Ministry of Trade, stating that the toys "do not meet the requirements of the Toy Safety Regulation". The Ministry of Family and Social Services also said it determined that the toy "had a negative effect on the psychosocial development of children".

== See also ==
- Five Nights at Freddy's
- Bendy and the Ink Machine
- Baldi's Basics in Education and Learning
