= Rooster Teeth Games =

American video game developer, publisher and distributor

- Type: Division
- Industry: Video games
- Founded: January 25, 2017; 9 years ago, in Austin, Texas
- Defunct: May 15, 2024; 2 years ago
- Fate: Dissolved
- Headquarters: Los Angeles, California
- Key people: Michael Hadwin; (Director of Games); Alan Abdine; (SVP of Business Development); David Eddings; (Head of Game Publishing)
- Parent: Rooster Teeth
- Website: https://roosterteeth.com/

Rooster Teeth Games was an American video game developer, publisher and distributor based in Austin, Texas, serving as Rooster Teeth's video game division. It was focused on "bridging the gap between independent game developers and the worldwide community of gamers."

== History ==
Rooster Teeth Games was officially launched January 25, 2017. The aim is to help indie-developers gain exposure through Rooster Teeth’s large fan-base by developing games on all platforms for their community. The announcement was received positively, with The Mary Sue calling it, "a perfect fit" given the company's "upstart background" starting with Red vs. Blue.

RWBY: Grimm Eclipse is a traditional hack and slash single and multiplayer game that uses chain combos and is based on the popular anime RWBY. It was originally developed in 2014 by a fan, Jordan Scott, in celebration of Rooster Teeth's anniversary. At RTX 2014, Rooster Teeth announced that they had hired Scott, and officially picked up the game. Rooster Teeth CEO Matt Hullum stated, "RWBY is a natural choice for us to focus on for our first in-house produced video game. Fans can expect that we will bring the same level of originality in action, comedy and design to the video game that has made the RWBY animated series such a hit." RWBY: Grimm Eclipse was a bestseller when it was released on Steam in the summer of 2016 and is a top-10 seller on PS4 and Xbox One. They were awarded Best Video Game Studio/Developer 2014 by The Austin Chronicle for RWBY: Grimm Eclipse.

In early 2017, Rooster Teeth Games had become a game publisher for independent games in addition to its video game development. In June 2017, it was announced David Eddings had joined as its head of game publishing. On September 27, 2017, Rooster Teeth Games announced a Kickstarter campaign for its first official board game, also based on RWBY, titled RWBY: Combat Ready in collaboration with Arcane Wonders. The campaign successfully reached its goal within days.

Its next game, Vicious Circle, described as an "uncooperative shooter" was released in August 2019. The game transitioned to a free to play model in November 2019 and refunds were offered to those who had purchased the game for full price.

On March 6, 2024, general manager Jordan Levin notified employees that Rooster Teeth would close over the next several months. In an email, he cited "fundamental shifts in consumer behavior and monetization across platforms, advertising, and patronage", with it being reported that the number of subscribers to its "First" service had dropped to around one quarter of their peak and that Rooster Teeth as a whole had been unprofitable for a decade. The Roost Podcast Network will remain in operation while Warner Bros. Discovery seeks a buyer. The company will also gauge interest in the Rooster Teeth library and intellectual property.

== List of games developed and/or published ==
=== Video games ===
Year	Title	Platform	Genre	Developer	Publisher	Additional note(s)
2014	Rooster Teeth vs Zombiens	Android, iOS, Microsoft Windows, macOS	Action	Team Chaos LLC	Rooster Teeth Games	Though the game can no longer be purchased on Steam, the DLC "Remember the Bungalow" can.
2016	RWBY: Grimm Eclipse	Microsoft Windows, macOS, PlayStation 4, Xbox One Nintendo Switch	Hack and Slash	Rooster Teeth Games	Rooster Teeth Games	Originally a fan made RWBY game that was later officially picked up by Rooster Teeth.
2016	Super Rad Raygun	Microsoft Windows	2D Sidescroller	Tru Fun Entertainment	Rooster Teeth Games	Publisher only. Co-published with ScrewAttack Games
2017	Battlesloths 2025: The Great Pizza Wars	Microsoft Windows	Top-down shooter	Invisible Collective	Rooster Teeth Games	Publisher only.
2018	Bendy and the Ink Machine	PlayStation 4, Xbox One, Nintendo Switch	Episodic survival horror	Kindly Beast (under the banner Joey Drew Studios)	Rooster Teeth Games	Publisher only.
2018	RWBY: Amity Arena	Android, iOS	Action	NHN Entertainment. BaobabNet	Rooster Teeth Games	Publisher only.
2019	RWBY Deckbuilding Game	Microsoft Windows, Android, iOS	Virtual Collectible Card Game	80Arcade	Rooster Teeth Games	Publisher only.
2019	RWBY: Crystal Quest	Android, iOS	Puzzle	EGLS Technology, Crunchyroll Games	Rooster Teeth Games	Publisher only.
2019	Vicious Circle	Microsoft Windows	Uncooperative multiplayer shooter	Rooster Teeth Games	Rooster Teeth Games	Title was announced on Rooster Teeth Podcast Episode 526.
2021	RWBY: Grimm Eclipse - Definitive Edition	Nintendo Switch	Hack and Slash	Rooster Teeth Games	Aspyr	

=== Board games ===
Year	Title	Players	Developer	Additional note(s)
2016	Million Dollars, But... The Game	2-6	Rooster Teeth Games	Based on Million Dollars, But...
2018	RWBY: Combat Ready	2-4	Rooster Teeth Games; Arcane Wonders	Based on RWBY.
2018	Achievement Hunter Heist	2-4	Rooster Teeth Games	Based on Achievement Hunter.
