= RWBY: Grimm Eclipse =

2016 video game

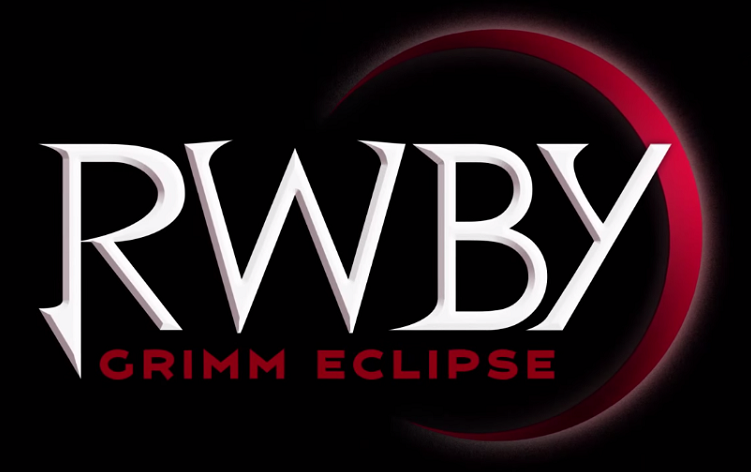
- Developer: Rooster Teeth Games
- Publishers: Rooster Teeth Games; Aspyr (Nintendo Switch)
- Director: Michael P. Hadwin
- Producer: Andy Messner
- Designer: Abe Robertson
- Programmers: Casey Donnellan; Stefan Sinclair
- Artist: Jordan Scott
- Composers: Jeff Williams; Steve Goldshein
- Series: RWBY
- Engine: Unity
- Platforms: Windows; macOS; PlayStation 4; Xbox One; Nintendo Switch
- Release: Microsoft Windows: WW: 5 July 2016; macOS: WW: 13 October 2016; Xbox One, PlayStation 4: WW: 17 January 2017; Nintendo Switch: WW: 13 May 2021
- Genre: Hack and slash
- Modes: Single-player, multiplayer

RWBY: Grimm Eclipse is a four-player co-op hack and slash video game and the first video game installment in the RWBY franchise. Developed and published by Rooster Teeth Games, it was released as an early access title on Steam on December 1, 2015, with the full Windows release on July 5, 2016. The game was released for macOS on October 13, 2016, and was later released for Xbox One and PlayStation 4 on January 17, 2017. The game's Definitive Edition was released for Nintendo Switch on May 13, 2021, published by Aspyr. The game received mixed reviews from critics, who cited its overall gameplay as the main flaw.

== Gameplay ==
The game allows one to four of the main characters to battle through waves of Grimm with the gameplay having experience points that allow the player to upgrade their character's status. The action takes place in the Emerald Forest, Mountain Glenn, Forever Fall and ultimately to an island named after the antagonist, Doctor Merlot.

== Plot ==
In the game, teams RWBY and JNPR are sent to Emerald Forest to fix some security grids sabotaged by a device with an unknown mark. Their search for their mysterious adversary brings them to Mountain Glenn, where they encounter some kind of mutated Grimm and in Forever Fall, they find a freighter belonging to Merlot Industries, a company founded by Doctor Merlot, an old acquaintance of Professor Ozpin who is obsessed with the Grimm and played a hand in the Mountain Glenn incident. The heroes arrive at Doctor Merlot's laboratory, which is an island with a green substance that he uses to mutate the Grimm. After destroying Merlot's experiments and his masterpiece, a mutant Deathstalker, the heroes escape on a shuttle as Merlot sets his lab to self-destruct.

== Development ==
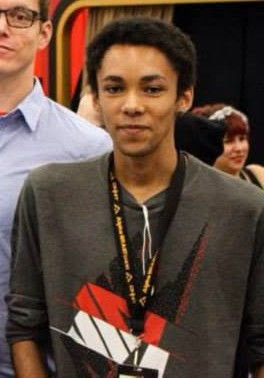
Jordan Scott, the creator of RWBY: Grimm Eclipse

For Rooster Teeth's anniversary in 2014, fan Jordan Scott created the game. It was in development for a total of five months.

Based on the events in the first trailer, the demo was a "hack 'n slash survival" featuring Ruby facing escalating waves of Grimm attacks. Richard Eisenbeis of Kotaku praised its combo system, which "excellently mirror[ed] its animated counterpart", and its unlockable skills, saying, "you'll feel like an unstoppable badass akin to Ruby in the series."

At RTX 2014, Rooster Teeth announced that they had hired Scott, and officially picked up the game. An early demo of the game was available for consumers to play at the event, and the game's title was changed from "Grim Eclipse" to "Grimm Eclipse" to match the spelling of the creatures in the show. Rooster Teeth CEO Matt Hullum stated, "RWBY is a natural choice for us to focus on for our first in-house produced video game. Fans can expect that we will bring the same level of originality in action, comedy and design to the video game that has made the RWBY animated series such a hit."

== Reception ==
The game received an aggregate score of 57/100 on Metacritic for its Xbox One version, indicating "mixed or average reviews".

Simone Tagliaferri of Multiplayer.it rated the original PC version 5/10, calling it overly short and lacking in content, and suggesting that only fans would enjoy it.

Audra Bowling of RPG Fan rated the Definitive Edition 70/100, calling the game's skill tree "surprisingly customizable" and the soundtrack "excellent", but saying that even fans might be disappointed with the game's "dated" graphics and "nightmarish" camera controls. She suggested it would be a bad place for newcomers to the series to start.

Milan of PLAY! Zine rated the Definitive Edition 5/10, calling it an "attempt at a quick cash grab", but praising the fact that the downloadable content was included with that version, as well as the co-op elements.
