= Adrienne Kress =

Canadian author and actress

- Born: Toronto, Ontario, Canada
- Occupations: Writer, Actor
- Writing career
- Genres: Children's and young adult
- Notable works: Alex and the Ironic Gentleman, Five Nights at Freddy's: Return to the Pit
- Website: www.adriennekress.com

Adrienne Kress is a Canadian author and actress.

== Career ==
Adrienne Kress is the author of the children's novels Alex and the Ironic Gentleman and Timothy and the Dragon's Gate (Scholastic), as well as the Young Adult novels, The Friday Society (Penguin) and Outcast (Diversion Books).

In 2016 and 2017 she released two new Middle Grade novels, each the first in an upcoming series: The Explorers: The Door in the Alley (Random House) and Hatter Madigan: Ghost in the H.A.T.B.O.X., the latter in collaboration with The New York Times bestselling author Frank Beddor (set in the same world as his Looking Glass Wars trilogy).

Hatter Madigan: Ghost in the H.A.T.B.O.X. was announced on The View with Adrienne cosplaying as Alyss Heart, one of the series' protagonists, along with Whoopi Goldberg who supported the Kickstarter campaign for the creation of a Looking Glass Wars graphic novel and bought a reward to have the character The Queen of Clubs in the book series based on her.

Also in 2016, her essay appeared alongside Margaret Atwood and Mariko Tamaki in the non-fiction anthology The Secret Loves Of Geek Girls (Bedside Press).

The second book in The Explorers series: The Reckless Rescue was released in the spring of 2018, with the third book,The Explorers: The Quest for the Kid, following in 2019.

Also in 2019, Adrienne released the first novel based around the video game franchise Bendy and the Ink Machine, Bendy and the Ink Machine: Dreams Come to Life, with three subsequent books released between 2019 and 2023. Adrienne followed up in 2024 by co-writing Five Nights at Freddy's: Return to the Pit, an interactive novel in the Five Nights at Freddy's game franchise, with franchise creator Scott Cawthon, released that December.

In 2024, Adrienne has also been featured on InnerSPACE for her work incorporating the martial art of Bartitsu made famous by Arthur Conan Doyle into The Friday Society.

== Film Adaptations ==
According to Variety and The Hollywood Reporter, the film rights to Alex and the Ironic Gentleman have been bought by The Weinstein Company.

According to Variety and Quill & Quire, Disney is adapting The Explorers with Academy Award Nominee Michael De Luca attached as producer.

== Awards ==
- Alex and the Ironic Gentleman won the Heart of Hawick Children's Book Award in the UK and was nominated for the Red Cedar in Canada.
- Timothy and the Dragon's Gate was nominated for the Audie (USA) and the Manitoba Young Readers Choice Award (Canada).

== Bibliography ==
=== Novels ===
- Kress, Adrienne. The Friday Society (Dial Penguin [Razorbill Canada] 2012)
- Kress, Adrienne. Outcast (Diversion Books, 2013)
- Kress, Adrienne. Hatter Madigan: Ghost in the H.A.T.B.O.X. (Automatic Publishing, 2016)

==== Ticket to Ride series ====
- Kress, Adrienne. Ticket to Ride: An Unexpected Journey (Andrews McMeel Publishing, 2024)

==== The Explorers series ====
- Kress, Adrienne. The Explorers: The Door in the Alley (Delacorte Random House, 2017)
- Kress, Adrienne. The Explorers: The Reckless Rescue (Delacorte Random House, 2018)
- Kress, Adrienne. The Explorers: The Quest for the Kid (Delacorte Random House, 2019)

==== Bendy and the Ink Machine series ====
- Kress, Adrienne. Bendy and the Ink Machine: Dreams Come to Life (Scholastic, 2019)
- Kress, Adrienne. Bendy: The Illusion of Living (Scholastic, 2021)
- Kress, Adrienne. Bendy: The Lost Ones (Scholastic, 2021)
- Kress, Adrienne. Bendy: Fade to Black (Scholastic, 2023)

==== Five Nights at Freddy's interactive novel ====
- Cawthon, Scott. Kress, Adrienne. Five Nights at Freddy's: Return to the Pit (Scholastic, 2024)

==== Alex and the Ironic Gentleman series ====
- Kress, Adrienne. Alex and the Ironic Gentleman (Weinstein Books [Scholastic UK/Canada] 2007)
- Kress, Adrienne. Timothy and the Dragon's Gate (Weinstein Books [Scholastic UK/Canada] 2008)

=== Short fiction ===
- Kress, Adrienne. "The Clockwork Corset", Corsets & Clockwork: 13 Steampunk Romances [edited by Trisha Telep] (Running Press Kids, 2011)

=== Non-Fiction ===
- Kress, Adrienne. "The Inevitable Decline of Decadence", The Girl Who Was on Fire - Movie Edition [edited by Leah Wilson] (Smart Pop Books, 2012)
- Kress, Adrienne. "The Emergence of YA", The Complete Guide to Writing for Young Adults [edited by Gabrielle Harbowy] (Dragon Moon Press, 2014)
- Kress, Adrienne. "I'm Your Biggest Fan", The Secret Loves Of Geek Girls [edited by Hope Nicholson] (Bedside Press, 2016)
