= Bendy and the Ink Machine =

2017 indie survival horror video game

- Developer: Joey Drew Studios (Note: Originally known as TheMeatly Games)
- Publishers: Joey Drew Studios; Rooster Teeth Games (consoles)
- Directors: theMeatly; Mike Desjardins (Note: Formerly credited as Mike Mood)
- Designers: theMeatly; Mike Desjardins; Matt Goles; Dan Tozer
- Programmer: Mike Desjardins
- Artist: theMeatly
- Writers: theMeatly; Bookpast
- Composer: theMeatly
- Series: Bendy
- Engine: Unity
- Platforms: Microsoft Windows; macOS; Linux; PlayStation 4; PlayStation 5; Xbox One; Xbox Series X/S; Nintendo Switch; iOS; Android
- Release: Chapter One: Moving Pictures; February 10, 2017; Chapter Two: The Old Song; April 18, 2017; Chapter Three: Rise and Fall; September 28, 2017; Chapter Four: Colossal Wonders; April 30, 2018; Chapter Five: The Last Reel; October 26, 2018; Complete Edition; October 27, 2018; PlayStation 4, Xbox One, Nintendo Switch; November 20, 2018; iOS, Android; December 21, 2018; PlayStation 5, Xbox Series X/S; May 9, 2025
- Genre: Survival horror
- Mode: Single-player

Bendy and the Ink Machine (Note: Commonly abbreviated as BatIM) is an episodic survival horror game developed and published by Joey Drew Studios. It was initially released to Game Jolt on February 10, 2017, as the first of five chapters, with a full worldwide release on October 27, 2018. The game was also released for PlayStation 4, Xbox One, and Nintendo Switch on November 20, 2018, being published by Rooster Teeth Games, for iOS and Android on December 21, 2018, and for PlayStation 5, and Xbox Series X/S on May 9, 2025.

Inspired by the BioShock game series, the game is set in the fictional Joey Drew Studios. The player controls Henry Stein, a retired animator who receives a letter inviting him back to his old workplace. Stein discovers a series of strange paranormal activities caused by the titular Ink Machine. In the game, players navigate through a first person perspective and need to complete certain tasks to proceed, such as combat, collecting objects, or solving puzzles. Players can also find audio logs recorded by the studio's employees to understand the game's history.

Bendy and the Ink Machine was well-received upon its initial release. Praise centered on its vintage aesthetic and story, although its puzzles and combat mechanics were less popular. In the months following its release, the game quickly gained a large following from exposure on platforms like YouTube and Twitch and eventually was approved through Steam Greenlight in mid-2017. Merchandise, as well as a mobile spin-off, was later introduced to further promote the game. Mike Desjardins, the game's programmer, and co-creator described the game as an "accidental success". A sequel, Bendy and the Dark Revival, was released on November 15, 2022.

A film adaptation from Radar Pictures, directed by André Øvredal, is in development.

== Gameplay ==
Bendy and the Ink Machine is a first person survival that resembles several cartoons in the 1920s to 1940s. The player plays as Henry Stein, a retired animator who returns to his old workplace, Joey Drew Studios, and discovers that a machine has destroyed the entire studio and brought certain cartoon characters to life. The game mixes combat with puzzle mechanics. Players explore through a first-person view and have limited physical actions such as running and jumping. Different items can be collected, some of which are required to perform various tasks before proceeding. Cans of bacon soup can also be collected for achievements and to restore Henry's health if he is injured.

Combat is primarily focused around a variety of different melee-based weapons, such as an axe, pipe, plunger, wrench, or scythe, though the scythe is not accessible in normal gameplay. Additionally, there are long-range weapons such as a tommy gun or bacon soup cans. In-game enemies have different strength levels and resilience to damage, forcing players to be tactical about keeping out of reach and striking when necessary. Failure to do so will result in a death. Henry can retreat inside Little Miracle Stations whenever enemies are nearby in order to recover or remain out of sight. If he takes too much damage, he can escape from the ink that consumes him and respawn at one of the numerous statues of Bendy that act as checkpoints. The player can save their progress by interacting with time card stations.

In addition, players can find numerous audio logs throughout the studio that give more details about the game's story, particularly concerning the fate of the studio and its employees, similar to the systems used in games such as BioShock. Some of these logs can be missed and require further exploration to uncover the secret areas they often reside in. During the final chapter, players unlock the Seeing Tool, which is a device used to view secret hidden messages that would be invisible without it. After completing it, players can also use it in the previous four chapters during replays.

== Plot ==
=== Chapter 1: Moving Pictures ===
In the year 1963, Henry Stein, co-founder and former animator at Joey Drew Studios, is invited back to the studio by his former friend and business partner, Joey Drew. Henry enters the studio and finds it abandoned and splattered with ink, as well as the mutilated corpse of what appears to be a figure of Boris the Wolf, one of the studio's fan favorite characters. Henry discovers that the mess was caused by the Ink Machine, a device Joey created after Henry had left with the purpose of generating real-life versions of the studio's cartoon characters.

Henry repairs the machine and activates it by collecting items left behind by the studio staff, but is then attacked by a monster taking an ink-based form of the studio's mascot, Bendy, called the Ink Demon. As Henry tries to escape, the floor collapses and he falls into the studio's lower levels, now flooded with ink. He drains the ink, finds an axe, and enters a room with coffins and a pentagram drawn on the floor. When he steps on the latter, he hallucinates several images of Bendy in quick succession and then passes out.

=== Chapter 2: The Old Song ===
Henry wakes up, retrieves his axe, and searches for a way out. He eventually comes to the music department and discovers an exit at the bottom of some stairs, but the stairs are flooded and blocking the door. After battling ink creatures known as Searchers, Henry finds music director Sammy Lawrence's office and finds a pump switch inside that could drain the ink at the stairs, but his office is blocked by a massive ink leak. Henry finds two valves that lower the ink pressure, one of which is held by a Searcher with a hat (actually the studio's lyricist Jack Fain) that he must defeat. At one point, he must learn to play Sammy's favorite song to open a door to reach the second valve.

After stopping the leak, Henry drains the ink at the stairs. While approaching the stairs, however, he is knocked out with janitor Wally Frank's dustpan by Sammy, who has turned into an ink humanoid with a Bendy mask. After Henry wakes up, Sammy reveals he intends to sacrifice Henry to the Ink Demon, whom he worships as a deity, so that he can be free of the ink. As Sammy begins the ritual, though, he is attacked by the Ink Demon and presumably killed. Henry breaks free and flees from Bendy into a storage room, locking the door behind him, while being chased by the Demon. Venturing into the room, he finds an alive and peaceful ink version of Boris the Wolf.

=== Chapter 3: Rise and Fall ===
When he wakes up, Henry finds himself in a small safehouse. He finds Boris and cooks a pot of bacon soup for him in exchange for a lever needed to open the exit. The two leave the safehouse to find another way out of the studio. After using a flashlight to make their way through a dark area, they come across the studio's Toy Department and find a back room full of merchandise for Alice Angel, the studio's lead female. After Boris is briefly separated from Henry, he gives him a Gent pipe to use as a weapon. Henry is then confronted by an ink version of Alice, who jumpscares him. He is then presented with a choice of two paths; the one chosen by the player will affect which of two easter eggs they'll be able to access, and the other will become blocked off.

Reaching Level 9, Henry and Boris discover multiple mutilated clones of Boris and other ink monsters collectively called the Butcher Gang, which Alice has been harvesting to improve her appearance. Meeting Alice, who is torturing one of the monsters, Henry is instructed to complete several tasks for her in exchange for being allowed to escape the studio. She provides him with various tools, which he must use to carry out her instructions while avoiding or fending off enemies.

As Henry completes the tasks, it becomes apparent that Alice is actually Susie Campbell, the character's original voice actress who became obsessed with Alice to the point of believing she was her character, and grew vindictive after she was replaced by another actress, Allison Pendle. She has since taken Alice's form after being corrupted by the ink. After Henry fulfills her needs, she sends him to the elevator where he can leave, but forces it to fall after discovering Boris, whom she wants to harvest as he is the most perfect Boris. Alice berates Henry for stealing from her and says she will take Boris from him instead. The elevator crashes, knocking Henry out. As Boris tries to wake Henry up, Alice kidnaps Boris and takes him away.

=== Chapter 4: Colossal Wonders ===
Waking back up from passing out and Boris' abduction, Henry leaves the broken lift and explores the cavernous archives of the studio to find and rescue Boris. After Alice taunts Henry over loudspeakers about Boris' capture, Henry comes across a lounge filled with Lost Ones, people infected by the ink who show no hostility. After fleeing through the vents, Henry discovers that Joey planned to open a Bendy-themed amusement park called Bendy Land, with the help of famed amusement park designer Bertrum Piedmont. Henry deduces that the haunted house attraction is the way to go and traverses the storage area to find the switches to power the ride up.

He activates the four power switches by playing carnival games, sneaking past the Butcher Gang, destroying an octopus ride with which an ink-corrupted Bertrum has merged himself, and escaping from "the Projectionist," an ink-corrupted creature with a movie projector for a head who was formerly studio projectionist Norman Polk. Henry watches the Ink Demon fight the Projectionist and tear his head off. Once on the haunted house ride, Henry is shocked to discover that Alice has transformed Boris into a vicious monster. Unable to turn him back to normal, Henry is forced to kill Boris, who fades away. An enraged Alice tries to attack and kill Henry herself, but is killed from behind by another, fully sane version of Alice Angel and a robot-handed clone of Boris.

=== Chapter 5: The Last Reel ===
The new Alice and Boris, dubbed Allison Angel (Allison Pendle) and Tom (Thomas Connor, the lead engineer of the Ink Machine), lock Henry in a makeshift prison, as they aren't sure if they can trust him. Henry manages to gain Allison's trust, and she gives Henry a Seeing Tool, which is used to see hidden messages; Henry sees a message that says Allison will leave Henry for dead (which is later proven true).

Later, the Ink Demon discovers Allison and Tom's location, and Tom (still distrusting Henry) convinces Allison to leave Henry behind so they can escape, knowing that they can't get him out before the Ink Demon arrives. Henry manages to escape the prison on his own after discovering a secret room with a weapon behind the wall, thanks to the hidden messages. Once he escapes, Henry sees Allison and Tom escaping on a barge through a river of ink. He follows them on a second barge, with a massive Bendy hand chasing behind him. Henry arrives in a shanty town built by the Searchers and the Lost Ones. There, he is confronted by an injured Sammy, who deliriously believes Henry is the Ink Demon and tries to take revenge for almost killing him. Sammy overpowers Henry and tries to kill him, but is killed by Tom, who finally trusts Henry and equips him with an axe. With Sammy out of the way, the Searchers and Lost Ones he was keeping at bay become violent and start attacking. Henry, Allison, and Tom work together and defeat the wave of monsters. Henry leads the way onward, but falls into the administration offices on a lower level. Henry tries to escape through the film vault, but the entrance is flooded. He works to reconnect the pipe system to drain the ink, all while hiding from the Butcher Gang.

Once in the film vault, a message reveals that a film reel has been stolen by the Ink Demon. Allison and Tom arrive and join Henry on his quest to find the Ink Demon. They discover that Bendy's lair is a massive version of the Ink Machine. Henry is forced to go in alone, as the entrance is surrounded by ink, which could reabsorb and kill Allison and Tom. Inside, Henry finds a message from Joey, who talks about his downfall and how Henry can fix the darkness by showing the Ink Demon the stolen reel, titled "The End". It's revealed that the Ink Machine was used in a combination of occult magic and technological alchemy to create real-life mascots for Bendy Land, but the Ink Demon was abandoned in the depths of the studio, as unlike the other creations, which are made from the souls of the staff, he was made from scratch and soulless as a result, locked away in a prison-like throne room filled with cartoons in a vain attempt to imprint the desired traits onto him. The Ink Demon arrives and transforms into a massive monster, known as Beast Bendy, knocking Henry into another room and giving chase. Henry escapes the Ink Demon and returns to his throne to play "The End" reel, which broadcasts the words "The End" on several screens, causing the Ink Demon to dissolve as his story comes to a close.

Afterwards, Henry is transported to Joey's apartment, who talks about how the two went on different paths, and how Joey's path burned because of his ambition. He summons Henry to the studio and the events of the beginning of the game play again, revealing that Henry is caught in a time loop called the cycle.

In a post-credits scene, the camera zooms in on a signed picture from Henry of Bendy, Boris and Alice Angel. Offscreen, a young girl asks her "Uncle Joey" to tell her another story.

== Characters and voice cast ==
- Henry Stein (voiced by theMeatly) is a co-founder and animator of Joey Drew Studios, who created the characters in the Bendy cartoons. He is the main protagonist, who has returned to Joey Drew Studios after 30 years after receiving a letter from Joey Drew.
- Joey Drew (formerly voiced by David Eddings, currently voiced by Dave Rivas) is the founder and CEO of Joey Drew Studios. Prior to the game's events, Joey went bankrupt and the studio collapsed from its former glory.
- Wally Franks (voiced by theMeatly) is Joey Drew Studios' relaxed janitor. He is the only character to appear in all 5 chapters via audio logs. He is most known for his phrase "I'm outta here!"
- Thomas Connor (voiced by Mike Desjardins) is a gruff and grouchy mechanical engineer from Gent Enterprises who was hired by Joey Drew Studios to build the Ink Machine. He is married to Allison Pendle. In the game, he has been corrupted by the ink and turned into a Boris clone, who goes by Tom, friend of Allison. He is shown to be hostile towards Henry.
- Sammy Lawrence (voiced by Aaron Landon) is an antagonist of Bendy and the Ink Machine and the former music director of Joey Drew Studios, who started to go insane. By the events of the game, he has been corrupted by the ink and worships Bendy as a deity.
- Norman Polk (voiced by theMeatly) is the elusive and observant projectionist of Joey Drew Studios. By the events of the game, he has been turned into the Projectionist, a humanoid monster with a projector head.
- Susie Campbell (voiced by Alanna Linayre) is the original voice actress for Alice Angel, who became obsessed with the character, and went crazy when she was replaced by Allison Pendle. By the events of the game, she has been corrupted by the ink and turned into a twisted version of Alice.
- Alice Angel (voiced by Lauren Synger) is the lead female in the Bendy cartoons. In the game, she is a twisted form of the original character, taken form through her voice actress Susie Campbell.
- Jack Fain (voiced by Bookpast) is the main lyricist at Joey Drew Studios and Sammy's second-in-command. In the game, he has been corrupted by the ink and transformed into a Swollen Searcher.
- Shawn Flynn (voiced by Seán "Jacksepticeye" McLoughlin) is a toymaker and the merchandise director at Joey Drew Studios.
- Grant Cohen (voiced by Will Alex "DAGames" Ryan) is Joey Drew's exasperated accountant.
- Bertrum Piedmont (voiced by Joe J. Thomas) is a famed British theme park designer, who built the Bendy-themed amusement park, Bendy Land and rejects his treatment by Joey Drew. In the game, he has merged with an octopus ride.
- Lacie Benton (voiced by Lani Minella) is an engineer working under Bertrum Piedmont. Minella also voices a cheeky, childish Searcher named Heidi in the sequel Bendy and the Dark Revival.
- Allison Pendle (voiced by Lauren Synger) is the second voice actress for Alice Angel, replacing Susie Campbell. She is married to Thomas Connor. In the game, she has been corrupted by the ink and transformed into a kinder form of Alice Angel named Allison, friend of Tom.

Additionally, there are multiple characters in the game with no featured dialogue:

- The Ink Demon is the main antagonist. He is a vicious and deformed version of Bendy, the main character of the Bendy cartoons.
- Boris the Wolf is a secondary character in the Bendy cartoons. In the game, a friendly version of him known as Buddy Boris appears as Henry's companion, before he is transformed into Brute Boris by Alice. Additionally, multiple clones of Boris appear throughout the game as mutilated corpses. He is the corrupted version of Buddy.
- The Butcher Gang are a trio from the Bendy cartoons, who are always at odds with Bendy. In the game, they appear as the Piper (Charley), the Fisher (Barley) and the Striker (Edgar). The sequel introduced a fourth member, the Slasher (Carley).
- The Searchers are a group of humanoid ink creatures who attack Henry throughout the game. They have multiple variants, such as the Miner Searcher.
- The Lost Ones are employees of Joey Drew Studios, who have been corrupted by the ink, and are not hostile. A specific Lost One is voiced by Joe J. Thomas.
- The Swollen Searchers are enlarged and passive forms of the Searchers. Henry can harvest ink from them and use it to create needed objects.

== Development ==
Bendy and the Ink Machine release timeline
2017	Chapter 1: Moving Pictures
2017	Chapter 2: The Old Song
2017	Chapter 3: Rise and Fall
2018	Chapter 4: Colossal Wonders
2018	Chapter 5: The Last Reel
2018	PS4, Xbox One, and Nintendo Switch release
2018	iOS and Android release

The idea for Bendy and the Ink Machine came from theMeatly pondering the idea of a world that resembled a cartoon sketch. As he started developing the idea, he realized that it felt "creepy" and needed a monster that inhabited it. Bendy was created to be that monster, but did not have a name. When the character finally received a 3D model, the name was chosen from a typo while saving it in a 3D modeling program, Blender. theMeatly was not a programmer and thus Mike Desjardins joined the production as he saw potential in the game. Bendy and the Ink Machine was inspired by the BioShock series.

The first chapter, "Moving Pictures", took five days to be finished. The game was then released for free on Game Jolt on February 10, 2017. Originally, the project was "for fun", according to Mike Desjardins, but it later became viral and incentivized them to develop a second chapter, "The Old Song", which was officially announced in March 2017 and took six weeks to be finished. It was released on April 18, 2017, and also added a remastered version of the previous chapter, an updated menu, subtitles, achievements, etc. The game was approved by Steam Greenlight on February 28, 2017, and was then released on Steam on April 27, 2017. "Chapter 1" was made available for free, while "Chapter 2" was released as a DLC for $6.

The third chapter, "Rise and Fall", was announced on production in May 2017. It was developed by six people in at least four months, and the reason for its long development, according to Mike Desjardins, was because he needed to create a framework "to make the process smoother". Its trailer was released in August 2017, which showed an animated short entitled "Tombstone Picnic" and showed Henry running from Ink Bendy in a room. However, Mike Desjardins stated it was used only for the trailer's chase sequence and for test purposes. (Note: The room was later added with the final remaster of "Chapter 3", which was released along with "Chapter 4".) It was released on September 28, 2017, while the previous two chapters also received remastered versions.

On October 27, 2017, the game had a crossover with Hello Neighbor, making changes like replacing Ink Bendy and Sammy Lawrence with the Neighbor, as well as replacing Ink Bendy's chase music with the Neighbor's. The crossover lasted until October 31. The Hello Neighbor side of the crossover can be accessed through the Steam beta system, while the Bendy and the Ink Machine side of the crossover, widely believed to be lost, can still be downloaded through Steam's depot system.

The fourth chapter, "Colossal Wonders", was firstly confirmed in production on November 17, 2017. It also included remastered versions of the first three chapters, which included enhanced soundtracks and textures. It was released on April 30, 2018. Originally scheduled for April 28, it was delayed due to technical problems on Steam that disallows to make releases during weekends. The fifth and final chapter, "The Last Reel", was firstly confirmed in production on June 4, 2018. Later, it was announced that it would be released in October, and that it would be received for free for players who have bought the previous chapters. A special edition, titled Bendy and the Ink Machine: Jacksepticeye Edition, was given to YouTuber Jacksepticeye before the fifth chapter released to the public, which included all five chapters. The chapter was released on October 26, 2018. The game received a final bundle on the next day, titled Bendy and the Ink Machine: Complete Edition. Chapters 2–4, which were previously available as downloadable content, became free, while the game became paid.

On January 29, 2018, theMeatly officially announced that Bendy and the Ink Machine would be released to consoles. The PlayStation 4 and Xbox One ports were published by Rooster Teeth Games, originally intended to be released on October 26, 2018, while the Nintendo Switch port was scheduled to release on November 20, but both PlayStation 4 and Xbox One's release dates were pushed to the same date for Nintendo Switch's release. On December 15, 2018, a mobile port was announced by theMeatly and Joey Drew Studios, and it was released on December 21, 2018.

In 2025, Bendy and the Ink Machine received current-generation console ports for PlayStation 5 and Xbox Series X/S, with development handled by Dundee-based studio Pocket Sized Hands. The ports were published by Silver Lining Interactive and Joey Drew Studios, launching digitally at the end of Q2 2025. A physical edition was made available for PlayStation 5, which included a download code for the game's original soundtrack. The Nintendo Switch version also received an enhanced remaster with improved graphics and updated gameplay, scheduled for physical release on February 20 developed by Pocket Sized Hands and distribution handled by Silver Lining Interactive. These next-generation ports featured primarily graphical and performance upgrades.

== Reception ==
Reception

Aggregate scores
Aggregator	Score
Metacritic	71/100 (PS4); 70/100 (Xbox One); 63/100 (Switch)
OpenCritic	58% recommend

Review scores
Publication	Score
4Players	70/100
Nintendo Life	6/10 (Switch)
Official Xbox Magazine (UK)	6/10

According to the aggregating review website Metacritic, Bendy and the Ink Machine received "mixed or average reviews" on its console ports. Fellow review aggregator OpenCritic assessed that the game received fair approval, being recommended by 58% of critics. The website Rock, Paper, Shotgun considered the first chapter one of the best free games from the week.

The game's storyline and setting were mostly praised. Most reviewers noted that the game's art style resembles the "Steamboat Willie" era of Disney's cartoons, with PlayStation LifeStyle describing Bendy as an "obvious parallel" between other cartoon characters such as Mickey Mouse or Betty Boop. Liam Martin of Express said that the game's theme is that "classic cartoons are more sinister than we remember". Sean Warhurst of ImpulseGamer also viewed the game's visuals as the game's "biggest strength" and said its graphics engine "complements the artistic direction". This was also discussed by Barry Stevens of Entertainment Focus, who said that "the game has a really unique art style and really pulls off the old animation studio feel with everything being drawn in a 30s style".

Most websites considered the game's gameplay mechanics repetitive. TheXboxHub described the game's combat mechanics as "frustrating", since most of its enemies die in only one hit. VGCultureHQ said that some range weapons in the second chapter, such as a gun or a slingshot, "would help make lengthy combat sequences feel more fair and less of a risk". However, it also stated that the boss battles in the game feel "intense". The puzzles, according to The Digital Fix, were repetitive, saying that "It's something we've done a million times before".

VGCultureHQ complained that the game's chapter lengths were "too short" and without a "fair balance", considering that it could be completed in four hours; the first and final chapters could be "finished in just under a half-hour", while the other three chapters "may take longer". According to Hely on Horror, the first chapter serves as a "tutorial", as it guides the player to "interact with the environment and solve simple puzzles", the second chapter is where combat is introduced, but the third chapter is where players are thrown into the action. Steven Asarch of Player.One felt the third chapter's task list to be a "lazy attempt for developers to pad [the] game for length without adding any additional content", and that if future chapters focused more on character development, "they could truly be masterpieces".

The game has been frequently compared with BioShock, due to, according to PlayStation LifeStyle, the game having an "antique style". Nintendo Life noted similarities to the feeling of BioShock, from "the revelations that are made of Henry's past to the retro aesthetic that clings to every corner of the game's dilapidated setting". However, it also compared it to Resident Evil, and Outlast, considering it a "fusion". The game was also compared with Cuphead and Epic Mickey, for their homages to "rubber hose" animation and the style of 20th-century cartoons.

=== Sales ===
By 2017, the game achieved 750,000 downloads on Steam, according to Player.One.

=== Awards ===
The game has received the "Best Horror Game" award by IGN and is listed as #1 in "18 Best Horror Games of 2017". The mobile port received the "Game of the Day" award on February 23, 2019. TouchArcade nominated the mobile port as the "Game of the Week" on December 21, 2018.

== Legacy ==
YouTube was a big contributor for the popularity of Bendy and the Ink Machine. Many gamers such as Markiplier and Jacksepticeye were seen making "Let's Play" videos of Bendy and the Ink Machine, which reached millions of views. Many YouTube musicians also made fan songs for Bendy and the Ink Machine, the most popular being DAGames' "Build Our Machine", which has been viewed more than 200 million times. Some of the most popular fanmade songs were later included in an album entitled "Bendy's Inky Megamix", which was made to help raise donations for United Ways COVID-19 relief charity at Tiltify. Some of these fan-made songs were included in the game, including DAGames' "Build Our Machine", Kyle Allen's "Bendy and the Ink Machine Song", Random Encounters' "Bendy and the Ink Musical", and JT Music's "Can't Be Erased".

This caused the game to have a giant fanbase, which Desjardins described as different from the most fanbases, calling other games' fanbases sometimes "toxic". The game also attracted an audience of children, whose attention was mostly given to the character Bendy, although the game is T-rated. According to Mike Desjardins, what the made the game so popular was because of its characters.

It also surged merchandise from the game, such as toys, shirts, etc., which can be bought on the game's official store. Books and comic books were also released.

=== Spin-offs ===
A mobile spin-off called Bendy in Nightmare Run was announced on January 26, 2018. It was released on iOS on August 15, 2018, and on Android on September 27. The game is an endless runner style game involving the player characters of either Bendy, Boris, or Alice collecting Bacon Soup while running away from large bosses chasing the player character.

A spin-off called Boris and the Dark Survival was released on February 10, 2020, on Bendy and the Ink Machine's 3-year anniversary. The game is a prequel, taking place before the first chapter of the original game. It revolves around Boris the Wolf searching through the different levels of Joey Drew Studios looking for supplies for his safehouse while escaping Ink Bendy, Twisted Alice, the Projectionist, the Butcher Gang, or Borkis, a yellow-eyed version of Boris. The game also received several updates after its release. The latest one, Symphony of Shadows, was released on June 30, 2020. It was eventually renamed into Boris: Lone Wolf, adding additional content, secrets, and firmly placing the game during the events of Bendy and The Dark Revival on August 15th, 2025.

=== Joke games ===
On October 23, 2018, Joey Drew Studios posted on Twitter an image announcing a joke game, entitled Black Ink Possession, parodying Red Dead Redemption 2. During April Fools in 2020, the emprise poster a trailer of another joke game, Bendy Royale. It parodies Fortnite: Battle Royale, where it was meant to be a battle royale with Bendy and the Ink Machine characters being playable. Subsequent joke games and other media have been posted on Joey Drew Studios' channel with the likes of a supposed show known as Bendy: Ink Chronicles which was meant to be a live action adaptation of the original Bendy and the Ink Machine. The most recent joke game posted to the Joey Drew Studios channel is a game titled Bendy: Campus Crush, which parodies a stereotypical visual novel.

=== Crossovers ===
A Halloween crossover mod, Hello Bendy, was released for the game on October 27, 2017, for a limited time, featuring the Hello Neighbor antagonist, who takes the role as Bendy in all previous three chapters and Sammy Lawrence for Chapter 2. The mod's menu features the advertisement of pre-ordering the game Hello Neighbor. The mod expired by the end of October that year.

Co-creator Mike Desjardins has talked about wanting to do a crossover with Cuphead, which also was popular at around the same time and also uses rubber hose animation.

=== Bendy and the Dark Revival ===
Another game, Bendy and the Dark Revival, was announced on April 14, 2019. However, Mike Desjardins stated on February 13, 2019, that it would not serve as Bendy and the Ink Machine 2. A gameplay trailer was released on June 24, 2019, announcing the game's release for Fall 2019. However, in December 2019, a new trailer was released to say that the game was being delayed and will release sometime in 2020. Another trailer was released on June 1, 2020, revealing that the game would be released in its entirety with all five chapters included, unlike the first game which was released episodically. The trailer also suggested the game would come out in the latter half of 2020. However, on November 30, 2020, the developers announced that the game would be releasing in 2021, due to the COVID-19 pandemic. The developers also cited that the game will be ten times bigger than the original game and that they didn't want to rush the game. The game was, however, delayed once again to 2022 without being announced. On October 31, 2022, the official Bendy social media accounts announced that a trailer for Bendy and the Dark Revival would be uploaded the following day. The game was officially released on November 15, 2022. While serving as a sort of reboot, with characters getting new designs (such as Joey and Bendy), the game is a continuation of the original game.

=== Bendy: Secrets of the Machine ===
Another game, Bendy: Secrets of the Machine, was released on 14 April 2024. The player explores Gent's creation, solving puzzles and uncovering mysteries in the realm of Dark Puddles, where past, present, and future intertwine. Released on Steam as a free game, revealing a game called "B3ndy", now known as Bendy and The Ink Factory. It sporadically receives updates adding or removing secrets, or limited time events that grant an achievement upon completion.

=== Potential television adaptation ===
In 2020, Derek Kolstad, creator of the John Wick franchise, stated that he has interest in making a television adaptation based on the game.

=== Film adaptation ===
On Christmas Day 2023, it was officially announced that a film adaptation of the video game is in development with Radar Pictures involved. On Halloween 2024, André Øvredal (director of Trollhunter and Scary Stories to Tell in the Dark) was hired to direct the film, while another film company, Double Down Pictures, had joined development of the film.

== See also ==
- Cuphead
