= Bacon soup =

Type of soup

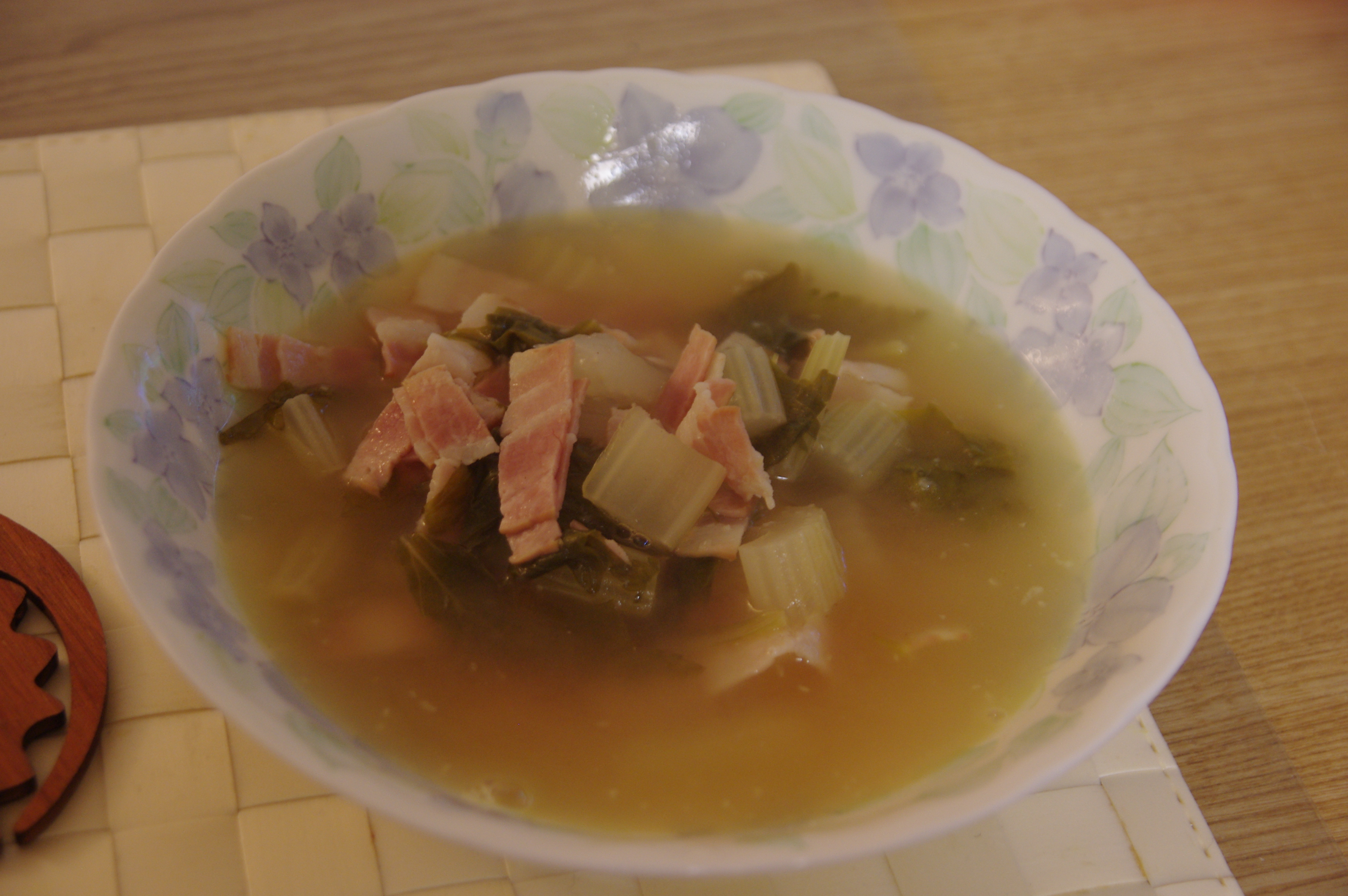
- Celery and bacon soup
- Type: Soup
- Course: Breakfast, lunch, dinner, or as a snack
- Region or state: Europe
- Serving temperature: Hot or cold
- Main ingredients: Bacon, vegetables

Bacon soup is a soup made with bacon. Generally a number of vegetables are added and often a thickening agent such as pearl barley, lentils or corn flour. It can be added to Italian minestrone soup to enhance the flavor.

Many variations exist, which may incorporate primary ingredients such as cabbage, beans, potato, lentils, spinach, peas, cauliflower, broccoli, leeks, pumpkin and rice.

Bacon is a common addition to many soups including creamy soups, especially those with a mild flavor that will not overpower the bacon.

== See also ==
- List of bacon dishes
- List of soups
