= Kara Eberle =

American actress (born 1989)

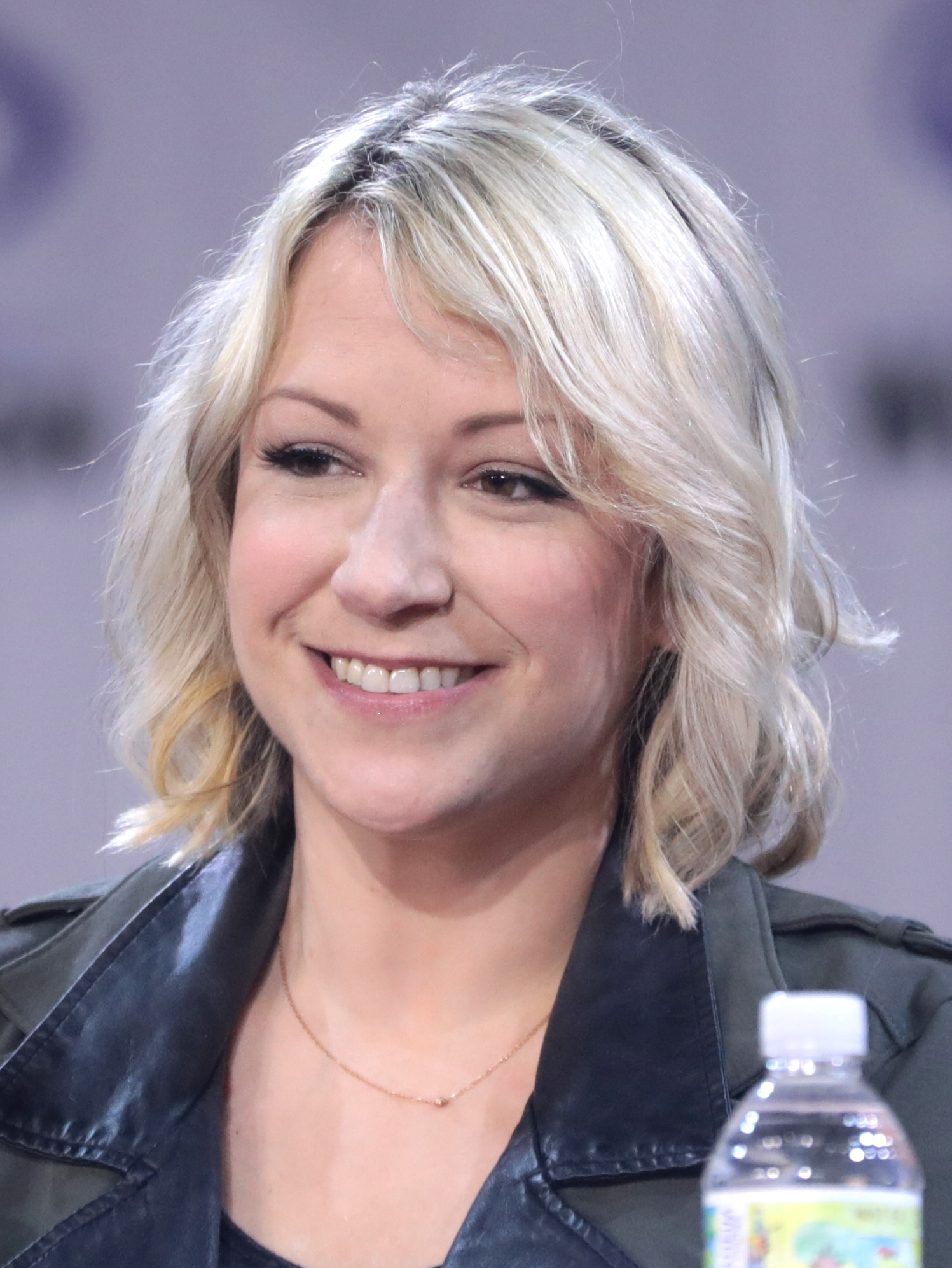
- Eberle speaking at the 2023 WonderCon in Anaheim, California
- Born: July 31, 1989 (age 37); San Marcos, Texas, U.S.
- Education: Texas State University
- Occupation: Actress
- Years active: 2013–present

Kara Eberle (born July 31, 1989) is an American actress, best known for voicing Weiss Schnee in the animated series RWBY.

== Early and personal life ==
Eberle was born in San Marcos, Texas on July 31, 1989. She began working in the animation industry in 2011 and met Monty Oum, with both becoming close friends, and Oum inviting her to voice a character in RWBY. Before working on RWBY, she worked as a receptionist, office manager, make-up artist, and set designer for podcasts, in the live-action department of Rooster Teeth. Eberle later said that at the time she got the role of Weiss, she was studying the Grimm Brothers during one of her college classes, Oum told her that he envisioned her as a princess named Weiss Schnee, or "Snow White" in German, and because she was half-German, she "had a bit a freakout" at the time.

In 2015, she stopped working in the Rooster Teeth office after "almost 4 years", but said she was still "part of the RT family, community, and Team RWBY." Eberle also studied Communications and Mass Media at Texas State University.

== Career ==
=== RWBY ===
In 2013, Eberle began voicing Weiss Schnee in RWBY. In August 2014, in an interview with Collider, she talked about what fans could expect in the show's second season, her character, and voiced her support for the ship of Blake Belladonna and Yang Xiao Long, known as "Bumbleby", as did Arryn Zech. The ship would become canon in the show's ninth season, when both characters kissed on screen.

Eberle voiced Weiss in various video games such as RWBY: Grimm Eclipse in 2015, BlazBlue: Cross Tag Battle in 2018, Smite: Battleground of the Gods in 2019, and RWBY: Arrowfell in 2022. She would also reprise the voice in RWBY Chibi. In an message at the end of RWBY: Official Manga Anthology Volume 2, which released in 2017, Eberle expressed her appreciation for the storytellers and artists which contributed to the volume, which centered on Weiss, and thanked readers for their "loyal support" and told people to "always use proper form."

Before Volume 6 of RWBY premiered, in 2018, Eberle told Inverse that during the season, Weiss's character is learning to examine the world "through her own eye...not what she’s learned from her past" and joked that Weiss is starting to "like" being around the other members of team RWBY, adding "everyone grows around that age," with Weiss's character realizing she needs to think for herself. In 2019, Eberle participated in an "Ask Me Anything" session on the Rooster Teeth official website, in which fans of RWBY asked her questions about Weiss, wanting to know more about the character. She told fans that Weiss loved "blueberry frozen yogurt," with CBR saying this was appropriate considering the "blue and white color scheme" of the character. Eberle later said that her voice acting as Weiss was "one of her biggest achievements". She would also explain, in an official companion book to the series, which released in 2019, that her favorite Weiss moment was when she stood up to her father in Volume 4, arguing that Weiss's ponytail being a bit off center was her "way of rebelling".

In 2022, Eberle voiced the English dubbed version of Weiss in the RWBY: Ice Queendom, an anime based on the original RWBY series, which focused primarily on Weiss's character, worldview, and her inner psyche in a dream world. Weiss is also known as "Ice Queen" due to her social coldness shown at the series beginning. Eberle was described as giving a "new take on her character" in the English dub, saying it is different than the portrayal by Japanese actress Yoko Hikasa, who voiced three versions of Weiss in the series.

In 2023, Eberle voiced Weiss once more, in the Justice League x RWBY: Super Heroes and Huntsmen Part One crossover film. The film premiered at WonderCon 2023 on March 25. She also voiced Weiss in Justice League x RWBY: Super Heroes and Huntsmen Part Two. When asked about the film by Pop Verse, Eberle said that she liked being part of something going beyond RWBY and DC but including Justice League characters, and said that her dad was "super excited," and described the film as a way for her and her dad to "connect."

=== Other work ===
Eberle has also appeared in Rooster Teeth animated shorts. After leaving Rooster Teeth, Eberle worked at Powerhouse Animation Studios, which is based in Austin, Texas, as an executive assistant, working to coordinate projects and streamline production. She also voiced the character Robin in the six-minute animated short LEGO Batman vs. Superman 2: Dawn of Just Desserts in January 2015.

Eberle has often appeared at conventions. Many of these conventions were about RWBY. For instance, she drove Oum to an anime convention in Dallas in 2013 and they saw a Ruby cosplayer together, who was unaware she was talking to Oum. She also appeared at New York Comic Con in 2017, 2018, and 2019, stating that 2019 was her first time she had been to New York City, and that she had been at the convention "three times". She also appeared at RTX in 2011, 2016 and 2018, and RTX at Home in 2021 and 2020. She also attended Otakucon in 2017 as a "guest of honour", Planet Comicon Kansas City in 2017, El Paso Comic Con in April 2018 FanX in September 2018, Chicago Comic and Entertainment Expo in 2020, Anime Corpus Christi in 2025. She is also scheduled to appear at SacAnime in August 2025 and Anime Nebraskon in October 2025. The latter also includes fellow RWBY voice actors Arryn Zech, Michael Jones, and Lindsay Jones.

== Filmography ==
=== Films ===
Year	Title	Role	Notes	Ref
2015	Lazer Team	Cheerleader	Cameo	
2023	Justice League x RWBY: Super Heroes & Huntsmen	Weiss Schnee	Voice only	

=== Web ===
Year	Title	Role	Notes	Ref
2013–present	RWBY	Weiss Schnee	Voice, motion capture	
2016-2018; 2021	RWBY Chibi	Weiss Schnee	Voice only	
2019	Death Battle	Weiss Schnee	Voice only; Episode: "Weiss VS Mitsuru (RWBY VS Persona)"	
2022	RWBY: Ice Queendom	Weiss Schnee	English dub; Voice only	

=== Video games ===
Year	Title	Role	Notes	Ref
2014	Smite	Weiss Schnee	Voice Only	
2016	RWBY: Grimm Eclipse	Weiss Schnee	Voice Only	
2018	BlazBlue: Cross Tag Battle	Weiss Schnee	Voice Only	
2018	Paladins: Champions of the Realm	Weiss Schnee	Voice Only	
2022	RWBY: Arrowfell	Weiss Schnee	Voice Only	
