= RWBY Chibi =

American animated web series by Rooster Teeth Animation

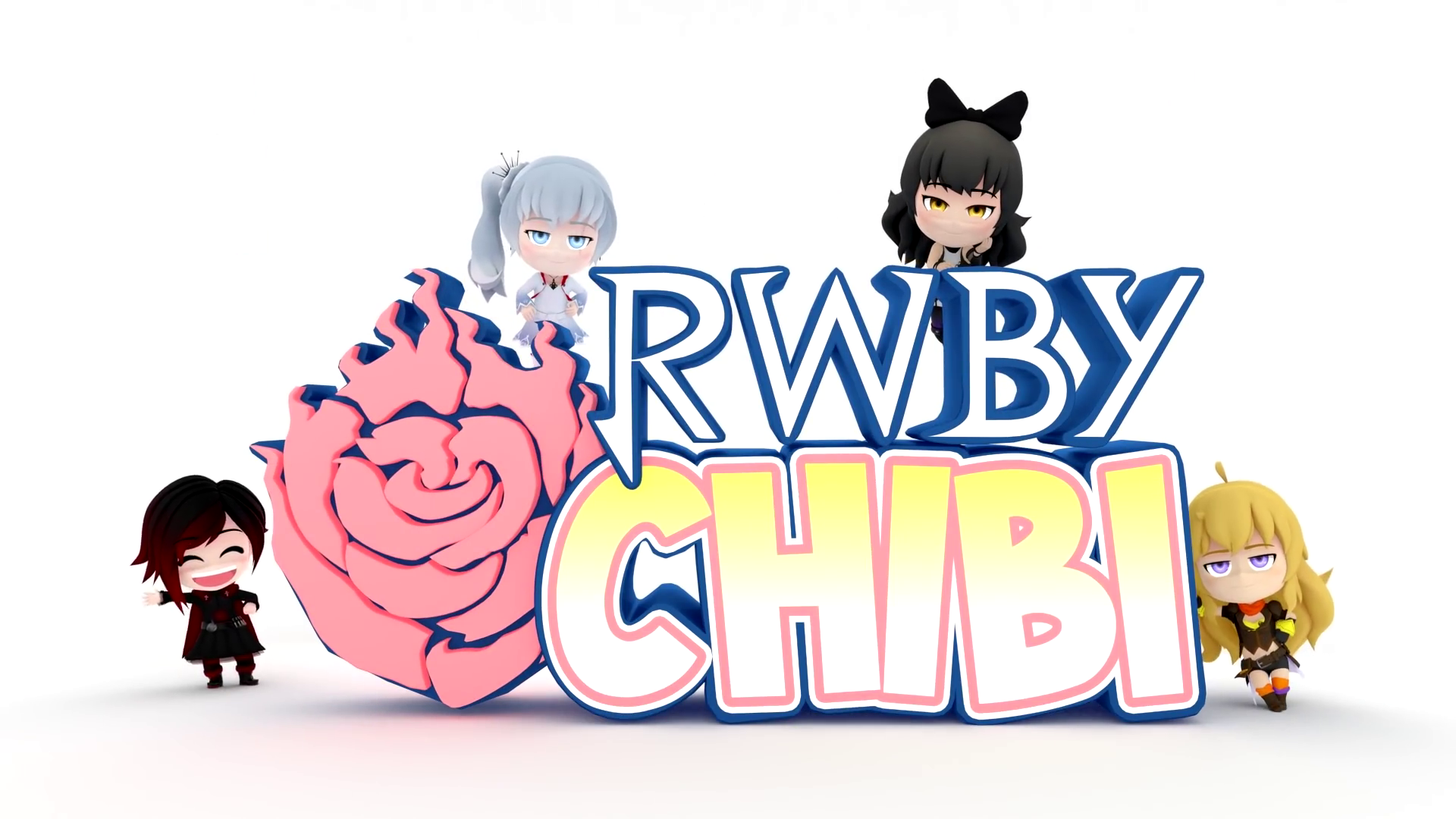
- Genre: Comedy
- Based on: RWBY by Monty Oum
- Developed by: Gray Haddock
- Voices of: Lindsay Jones; Kara Eberle; Arryn Zech; Barbara Dunkelman
- Theme music composer: Jeff Williams
- Composers: Jeff Williams; Alex Abraham
- Country of origin: United States
- No. of seasons: 3
- No. of episodes: 64 (+10 Neon Konbini) (list of episodes)

Production
- Executive producers: Matt Hullum; Burnie Burns; Kerry Shawcross
- Producer: Koen Wooten
- Editors: Stan Lewis; Richard Norman
- Production company: Rooster Teeth Animation

Original release
- Network: Rooster Teeth
- Release: May 7, 2016 – August 18, 2018
- Release: May 27 – July 15, 2021

RWBY Chibi is an American animated comedy web series produced by Rooster Teeth Animation for Rooster Teeth. It is a spin-off of RWBY, where each episode consists of several scenes where aspects of RWBY's characters are usually exaggerated for comic effect. The series was first announced as part of Rooster Teeth's 13th Anniversary celebration on April 1, 2016 and premiered May 7. In January 2017, Rooster Teeth confirmed that the second season's premiere would be later in that year on May 13 on Rooster Teeth and May 20 on YouTube. A third season premiered on January 27, 2018, on Rooster Teeth and February 3, 2018 on YouTube. Following the conclusion of the third season, the series would go on an indefinite hiatus.

The animated anthology series Neon Konbini, which premiered on May 27, 2021 on Rooster Teeth, would continue RWBY Chibi by airing ten individual segments of the series across its eight episodes before concluding on July 15, 2021. In March 2023, these segments were re-released on YouTube as the "fourth season" of RWBY Chibi.

== Voice cast ==
- Lindsay Jones as Ruby Rose
- Kara Eberle as Weiss Schnee
- Arryn Zech as Blake Belladonna
- Barbara Dunkelman as Yang Xiao Long
- Miles Luna as Jaune Arc
- Jen Brown as Pyrrha Nikos
- Samantha Ireland as Nora Valkyrie
- Neath Oum as Lie Ren
- Michael Jones as Sun Wukong
- Kerry Shawcross as Neptune Vasilias

== Development ==
RWBY Chibi was announced by Gray Haddock in April 2016. RWBY Chibi can be described as a comedy series consisting of two to five segments per episode. Each episode has a run time of about three to seven minutes. The series uses both the RWBY characters and world, but is animated in a different art style. RWBY Chibi is not considered to be canon, with characters repeatedly breaking the fourth wall. The first season premiered on May 7, 2016, and consisted of 24 episodes, which were aired weekly at the usual RWBY release time on Saturdays. It concluded on October 15, 2016, just one week before the release of the RWBY Volume 4 premiere. A second season of RWBY Chibi premiered on Rooster Teeth's web site on May 13, 2017. The third season premiered on January 27, 2018.

== Episodes ==
The first two episodes of RWBY Chibi

Season	Episodes	Originally aired	
Season	Episodes	First aired	Last aired
1	24	May 7, 2016	October 15, 2016
2	24	May 13, 2017	December 14, 2017
3	16	January 27, 2018	August 18, 2018
Neon Konbini	10	May 27, 2021	July 15, 2021

=== Season 1 (2016) ===
No. overall	No. in season	Title	Directed by	Written by	Length	Original release date	U.S. viewers (millions)
1	1	"Ruby Makes Cookies"	Kerry Shawcross	Kerry Shawcross; Story by : Miles Luna and Kerry Shawcross	3:37	May 7, 2016	N/A
"Ruby Makes Cookies" – Ruby attempts to make cookies, but encounters difficulties at every step of the way, ending with her unable to get the cookie into a glass of milk.; "Party Games" – Weiss plays a game of pin the tail on the donkey, using herself and Myrtenaster to pin the tail.; "Ninjas of Love" – Ruby comes across and reads Blake's copy of Ninjas of Love, an erotic book. She later admonishes Blake for possessing such "filth", but refuses to return it.; "Weiss and Yang Training" – Weiss and Yang spar outside Beacon Academy. Yang tries to take out Weiss, but Ember Celica jams. When Weiss taunts her, Yang is still able to punch her away.
2	2	"Cat Burglar"	Kerry Shawcross	Miles Luna and Kerry Shawcross	3:10	May 14, 2016	N/A
"Cat Burglar" – Team RWBY listens to a news report about a cat burglar. They immediately suspect Blake due to her being part cat. Blake acts offended by this profiling and leaves, stealing several items from the room in the process and escaping on Yang's motorcycle, which she uses to flee the police.; "Ice Skating" – Weiss skates on the surface of a frozen swimming pool with her teammates stuck in the ice.; "Jump Rope" – Blake and Yang use Gambol Shroud to play jump rope with Ruby, who sings a chant about Jaune falling over a candlestick. An injured Jaune appears, indignantly singing a similar chant about telling Blake to clean up after she's done reading.; "Yarn" – Yang offers Blake a ball of yarn to play with, but Blake is annoyed by this stereotyping. To the surprise of both, Ruby suddenly bounds into the room and starts enthusiastically playing with the ball of yarn like a cat.; "Blake vs. Zwei" – Zwei enters Team RWBY's empty dorm room and snoops around. After he leaves, Blake comes out of hiding and breathes a sigh of relief.
3	3	"Reloading"	Kerry Shawcross	Miles Luna and Kerry Shawcross	3:11	May 21, 2016	N/A
"Jaune Calls Weiss" – Jaune repeatedly calls Weiss, asking her out on a date, but he receives no answer. He leaves increasingly desperate and angry voice messages on Weiss' Scroll. Suddenly, Weiss appears and politely greets him, completely unaware of his messages, revealing that she lost her Scroll earlier. At that moment, Blake appears, having found Weiss' Scroll. A panicked Jaune snatches it away and destroys it to prevent Weiss hearing his messages. He leaves in a hurry, to Blake and Weiss' astonishment.; "Reloading" – Ruby fires different types of Dust rounds from her weapon, Crescent Rose, with the help of Weiss. She fires ice and fire rounds before the recoil from a gravity Dust round sends her flying.; "Blake Tag" – Blake uses her Semblance to evade Yang in an unfair game of tag.; "Blake vs. Zwei – Part 2" – Zwei enters an empty dining room and snoops around. After he leaves, the freezer door opens, revealing a shivering Blake hiding inside.
4	4	"Fighting Game"	Kerry Shawcross	Kerry Shawcross and Sean Murphy; Story by : Miles Luna, Kerry Shawcross and Sean Murphy	3:03	May 28, 2016	N/A
"Fighting Game" – Ruby and Yang play a fighting game on their Scrolls. Yang wins the fight, but when she is distracted by Zwei dragging Blake through the hallway, Ruby swipes her Scroll away before the next round. Yang is angered by this and literally catches on fire.; "Ice Sculpture" – Ruby is working on an ice sculpture. Weiss uses Myrtenaster and ice Dust to easily make a sculpture of a Beowolf, while Blake uses her semblance to effortlessly create an ice duplicate of herself. Ruby leaves, grumbling to herself.; "Present for Blake" – Feeling guilty for teasing Blake with cat toys, Yang buys Blake a tea set as a present, but Blake takes a greater interest in the box, and quickly sits in it like a cat.; "Marshmallows" – Yang tries to play her video game alone, but Weiss, Ruby, and Blake annoy her by poking her with sticks. Yang gets angry, her rage causing her to catch fire again. Ruby, Blake, and Weiss use the heat to cook marshmallows.
5	5	"Sissy Fight"	Kerry Shawcross	Miles Luna, Kerry Shawcross, and Sean Murphy; Story by : Miles Luna and Sean Murphy	3:37	June 4, 2016	N/A
"Costume Party" – Team RWBY have swapped outfits with their partners for a costume party, but Ruby and Jaune have both come dressed as Weiss. Jaune remarks, "Well, one of us is going to have to change!"; "Ear Cleaning" – Blake cleans both her ears and cat ears with cotton wads.; "Sissy Fight" – Ruby painstakingly makes a house of cards in her dorm, but Weiss knocks it over by slamming the door. In revenge, Ruby intentionally stomps in with muddy boots after Weiss finishes cleaning the kitchen. Finally, Weiss confronts Ruby at the Beacon courtyard, and the pair have a dramatic Western-style stand-off. They draw their weapons and attack, but end up having an anticlimactic slap fight.; "Shadow People" – The members of Team RWBY encounter some silhouette people (background characters from Volume 1), including one that bears an uncanny resemblance to Ruby, and have a conversation about the weirdness of their presence.
6	6	"The Vacuum"	Kerry Shawcross	Miles Luna and Kerry Shawcross; Story by : Austin Hardwicke, Miles Luna and Kerry Shawcross	3:20	June 11, 2016	N/A
"The Vacuum" – After Weiss finishes vacuuming the dorm room, Zwei and Blake come out of hiding and commiserate on their shared fear of vacuums.; "Cape Trubs" – Ruby experiences trouble with her cape, including getting stuck in doors, Jaune walking over it with muddy shoes, and accidentally hanging herself.; "Book Swap" – Blake finishes reading a book and realizes the sequel that she wants to read is a load-bearing book from her bunk bed. After Blake dramatically swaps the books without the beds collapsing, Ruby immediately asks Blake if she can read the book Blake had finished, much to her horror.; "The Fourth Wall" – Team RWBY are chatting when Team JNPR shows up with Pyrrha. A shocked Ruby tries to point out Pyrrha's death, only for Nora to vehemently insist that "nothing bad ever happened", looking at the audience as she does this. Ren then suggests that the group continue to do comedy segments, to which Pyrrha happily agrees.
7	7	"Prank Wars"	Kerry Shawcross	Kerry Shawcross and Miles Luna; Story by : Melanie Stern and Miles Luna	3:11	June 18, 2016	N/A
"Jaune Experiments" – Unsatisfied with his own weapon, Jaune takes Team RWBY's weapons for a spin.; "Prank Wars" – When her teammates prank her by dropping ice-cold water on her head, Weiss retaliates by dropping a bucket of solid ice on Ruby's head, knocking her out cold.; "Arcade Games" – Ren, Yang, and Nora are thrown out of the arcade when they use their weapons at the shooting gallery and "Whack-A-Grimm", though Nora still gets a prize of a giant teddy bear.
8	8	"Magnetic Personality"	Kerry Shawcross	Miles Luna and Kerry Shawcross	3:42	June 25, 2016	N/A
"Pickle Surprise" – Ruby tries to open a jar of pickles without much success. She eventually resorts to using Crescent Rose to cut the jar open, but it turns out the pickles' flavor is dill, which she hates.; "Tubby Tummy" – Dissatisfied with her figure, Yang starts a rigorous physical exercise regime to get into shape. However, Nora manages to keep in shape without any effort at all, to Yang's great annoyance.; "Magnetic Personality" – Pyrrha has trouble with her magnetic Semblance; first causing a bunch of metal kitchen appliances to fly at Nora when she surprises Pyrrha, then "accidentally" interfering with Jaune's compass when JNPR tries to go on a hiking trip. When Jaune offers Pyrrha to join the rest of the team in looking through old VHS tapes, she becomes reluctant, knowing what can happen.; "Going Down" – Team RWBY takes the elevator at Beacon Tower to the lowest level, the secret Vault. There, they encounter the janitor, Shopkeep.
9	9	"Ren Plays Tag"	Kerry Shawcross	Kerry Shawcross; Story by : Luis "Paco" Vazquez and Miles Luna	3:49	July 2, 2016	N/A
"Weiss Studying" – Ruby wants to do stuff with Weiss, but she's too busy studying to entertain her hyperactive partner. After several failed attempts to get Weiss' attention, Ruby eventually resorts to flopping around on her study desk like a fish, until she knocks herself senseless.; "Ren Plays Tag" – Team JNPR plays a game of tag. When Ren becomes "it", he puts himself through a disciplined martial arts training regime for his comeback. With his preparations finally complete, he tags Nora, but she simply tags him back immediately.
10	10	"Love Triangle"	Kerry Shawcross	Miles Luna and Kerry Shawcross	4:21	July 9, 2016	N/A
"Love Triangle" – Jaune asks Weiss if she would like to study with him for an upcoming exam, but she turns him down. Pyrrha then asks Jaune to study together, but he turns down her offer. Finally, Weiss approaches Pyrrha with the same question, but is also rejected. Ren looks on, lamenting that they all fail to see what's right in front of them. Nora, holding up a sign saying "NOTICE ME!", angrily agrees.; "Zwei Painting" – Ruby, Ren, Blake and Nora are painting Zwei as part of a painting contest judged by Weiss. Nora's painting is a crude fingerpainting rendition, Blake's portrays Zwei as a cat, and Ren's rendition is accurate and beautiful. However, Weiss fails to appreciate the artistic merit of Ruby's take, which has placed its focus firmly on Zwei's butt, but Ren seems to appreciate Ruby's vision.; "Makeover" – Ren allows Nora to give him a complete makeover, but when she has finished, Ren looks exactly the same. Unbeknownst to him, Nora has actually shaved the letters "R+N" into his hair. As they exit the room, Nora turns around and winks at the camera.
11	11	"Nurse Ruby"	Kerry Shawcross	Miles Luna and Kerry Shawcross; Story by : Kerry Shawcross	5:09	July 16, 2016	N/A
"Ren Makes Pancakes" – Ren makes pancakes, but they keep disappearing. Using the pancakes as bait, he sets up a trap and catches Nora.; "Jaune ASMR" – Jaune tries to create an ASMR video.; "Nurse Ruby" – Weiss is sick and asks Ruby to get her medicine. Ruby instead gets her home remedies like her dad used to, including a warm glass of whole milk, video games and a motivational poster of Blake in the "Hang in there, Baby" pose. When Yang finds out Weiss is sick, she also runs to get her more milk.
12	12	"Little Red Riding Hood"	Kerry Shawcross	Kerry Shawcross and Miles Luna	6:03	July 23, 2016	N/A
"Littering" – Sun and Neptune impersonate police detectives (complete with fake mustaches) and frame Jaune for littering, before proceeding to violently put him under "lockdown".; "Little Red Riding Hood" – Narrated by Ozpin, Team RWBY puts on a warped stage production of Little Red Riding Hood for Team JNPR. Ruby plays Little Red Riding Hood, Yang plays her grandmother, Blake plays the Big Bad Wolf (because she's half-animal) and Weiss plays the axe-brandishing woodsman, with Zwei acting as stage hand. The production is plagued by Yang's attention-hogging acting, Blake and Weiss' lack of enthusiasm, and Ruby's awful writing. The play ends when Ozpin realizes that they should actually all be in class.
13	13	"Spin the Bottle"	Kerry Shawcross	Miles Luna, Kerry Shawcross and Tom Alvarado	3:27	July 30, 2016	N/A
"Spin the Bottle" – Team JNPR, Weiss and Neptune play spin the bottle. When Jaune spins, it almost lands on Pyrrha and then Weiss, but eventually settles on Ren. Ren pauses before stoically taking a breath spray and turning to Jaune.; "Blake vs Zwei Pt 3" – Blake meticulously searches the dorm room for any signs of Zwei. Satisfied that the room is clear of canines, she lies down on her bed for a nap, only to discover that Zwei has taken the place of her pillow.; "Nora Workout" – Nora puts Yang, Blake and Ruby through an intense workout regime, but none of the three can keep up with her. The rest of Team JNPR turn up, all of them grievously injured from living with Nora.
14	14	"Big Vacation"	Kerry Shawcross	Tom Alvarado, Miles Luna and Kerry Shawcross; Story by : Tom Alvarado	4:31	August 6, 2016	N/A
"Tired Blake" – An exhausted Blake collapses on the floor after a tough exam. To her annoyance, Zwei attempts to comfort her with "unauthorized snuggles". When Zwei finally starts to leave in disappointment, Blake suddenly pulls him back to let him continue snuggling with her, though threatens to shave Zwei's butt if he tells anyone.; "Big Vacation" – Weiss is at the airport alone, about to depart on a beach holiday, when Ruby comes, telling her that, as BFF's, Ruby can just join if she wants. Weiss initially agrees, then sees Sun, Jaune, Yang, Blake, Nora, and Ren dragging a panicked Neptune behind him, rush by. Ruby then meekly admits to telling them about the trip.; "Junior Detectives: Bad Cop" – Nora is interrogated by Sun and Neptune, in character as Junior Detectives, in connection to the case of the missing pancakes (from Episode 11). Neptune tries to play the "bad cop", but Nora easily manipulates him into confessing to the crime instead.
15	15	"Neptune's Phobia"	Kerry Shawcross	Tom Alvarado and Miles Luna, and Kerry Shawcross; Story by : Tom Alvarado	4:38	August 13, 2016	N/A
"Bad Boy Jaune" – Jaune tries to be a "bad boy" and steals Yang's motorbike with Zwei, taking it on a stationary joy ride. An annoyed Yang kicks Jaune off and reclaims her bike. Zwei abandons him when Ruby shows up.; "Neptune's Phobia" – Neptune's crippling phobia of water extends to small puddles, rain and showers. When Neptune covers for Sun as a pool life guard, Jaune falls into the pool and drowns while Neptune pretends not to notice.; "Nora's Gift" – Ren receives a gift from a "secret admirer" (Nora). Ren refuses to open the present, reasoning that it is either a trap from an enemy or a prank set up by Nora. Meanwhile, Pyrrha hears unsettling growling sounds coming from the gift, causing Nora to realize to her horror that she forgot to put in airholes.
16	16	"Bike Race"	Kerry Shawcross	Tom Alvarado and Miles Luna; Story by : Tom Alvarado	4:23	August 20, 2016	N/A
"Bike Race" – In a street race refereed by Blake, Yang rides her motorcycle and Ruby rides in a red wagon pulled by Zwei. Both sisters make fun of Weiss when she joins on a pink tricycle. However, just before the race begins, Weiss freezes both Yang and Ruby's vehicles with Myrtenaster and pedals off to victory.; "Stand Up Yang" – Yang's pun-filled stand-up routine does not receive a warm reception. Sun upstages her with his heckling, while Yang gets dumped down a trapdoor.; "Jaune Ennui" – Ruby inexplicably walks in with a Beowolf stuck to her cape after a long day filled with adventure, excitement and many hijinks. Jaune laments that he feels like a "supporting character" to Blake, who obliviously confuses him with Sun.
17	17	"Save Nora!"	Kerry Shawcross	Tom Alvarado and Kerry Shawcross; Story by : Tom Alvarado	4:48	August 27, 2016	N/A
"Bathroom Break" – Jaune urgently needs to use the bathroom, which is occupied by Ren. Jaune writhes in discomfort, but tries to play it off as a new fighting technique when Pyrrha walks by. Nora and Sun both jump in and use the bathroom before Jaune has a chance, causing him to lose control in his pants. Jaune gingerly and awkwardly slinks away from Pyrrha, muttering about laundry.; "Save Nora!" – Nora feigns being attacked by a Beowolf, hoping to be saved by Ren, but she keeps getting rescued by other people (first Sun, then Yang). Ren eventually comes across Nora tormenting an unfortunate Beowolf and amusedly comments that she never ceases to amaze him. Nora takes this as a compliment and enthusiastically hugs the Beowolf, "breaking" it.; "Upgrade Time" – Junior Detectives Sun and Neptune have had little luck catching criminals recently. They decide to get an "upgrade" and buy a load of equipment, including helmets, riot shields and police motorcycles. When Emerald and Mercury steal their bikes, Sun and Neptune desperately try to give chase, but are hopelessly weighed down by all their gear.
18	18	"Evil Plans"	Kerry Shawcross	Tom Alvarado, Miles Luna and Kerry Shawcross; Story by : Tom Alvarado	5:21	September 3, 2016	N/A
"The Return of the Pickles" – Once again, Ruby struggles to open a jar of pickles. Sun offers his help, but fares no better. He suggests asking Yang for help, but Ruby tells him never to ask Yang for help with jars. However, at that moment Yang bursts into the kitchen. Yang's jar opening methods turn out to be needlessly violent and destructive.; "Evil Plans" – Cinder and Emerald openly draw up their "Ultimate Evil Plans" on a whiteboard in their dorm room. When they are paid an unexpected visit by the overly friendly pair of Ruby and Nora, they successfully play off their evil scheming as a cake recipe for a kitten charity, despite Mercury at one point walking in with a "Kitten Killer 9000" rocket launcher.; "Butler of Cakes" – When Ruby tries to bake a cake, the privileged Weiss asks her why she doesn't simply have her "cake butler" bring her one. Ruby leaves Weiss alone in the kitchen for five minutes, only to find the whole kitchen on fire when she returns. When Ruby asks Weiss to help clean up the mess she created, Weiss asks her what "cleaning up" is. Ruby sarcastically tells her to ask her cake butler after spraying her with a fire extinguisher and leaves.
19	19	"Pillow Fight"	Kerry Shawcross	Tom Alvarado, Miles Luna and Kerry Shawcross; Story by : Tom Alvarado	3:34	September 10, 2016	N/A
"Life of Zwei" – Ruby sees Zwei soundly asleep and says that she would love the "easy life" of a dog. Unbeknownst to her, Zwei's action-packed day actually includes saving Jaune from Beowolves, defusing bombs for Ren, finding Weiss' lost pendant and foiling the nefarious plans of Cinder.; "Pillow Fight" – Sun, Neptune, and Ren rejoice when they find out that Team RWBY are having a pillow fight. However, they are disappointed by the melodramatic performance, complete with hammy death scenes. The three boys decide to have a dainty pillow fight of their own. Ruby disapprovingly calls them all amateurs.
20	20	"Roman's Revenge"	Kerry Shawcross	Tom Alvarado, Miles Luna and Kerry Shawcross; Story by : Tom Alvarado	4:36	September 17, 2016	N/A
"Double Trouble" – Ruby, Jaune, and Weiss meet up with an apparently silent Blake that has a flat stare. They all presume it's her, but it turns out to be an inert copy, and when Blake comes to claim it, she's left confused when Ruby, Jaune, and Weiss all continue their conversations with her from before.; "Zwei vs. Beowolf" – While out for a walk, Zwei and a Beowolf get into a fight, embarrassing their respective owners, Ruby and Cinder.; "Roman's Revenge" – Roman and Neo get ready to have their revenge on Team RWBY, with Roman commenting that this time things will be different, but Neo displays her way of talking by holding up a sign saying "They Won't". Roman has Neo prepare the Death Ray and some explosive Dust crystals to fire at Team RWBY but their evil plan is foiled by Zwei.
21	21	"Cinder Who?"	Kerry Shawcross	Icha Hamkim, Miles Luna and Youngjin Hur, Kerry Shawcross, Kin Zaibatsu and Darcelle Majors; Story by : Icha Hamkim, Youngjin Hur, Kin Zaibatsu and Darcelle Majors	3:32	September 24, 2016	N/A
"Friend Forever" – Ruby tells Weiss she got them friendship bracelets, but then locks them both in handcuffs.; "Letter to Winter" – Weiss writes a letter to Winter about the formation of Team RWBY, but has trouble coming up with anything positive to say about her eccentric team leader, Ruby, who is doing crazy things with food nearby.; "Checkmate" – Ruby and Yang play chess. When Ruby declares "Checkmate", Weiss and Blake burst into the room with their weapons at the ready, confusing it with the code name for their team attack.; "Cinder Who?" – Ruby forgets Cinder's last name, leading to a number of visual puns, including Cinder "Mall" (Cinder shops for casual clothes at a mall), Cinder "Falls" (Cinder falls down a flight of stairs as Mercury has a laugh at her expense), Cinder "Doll" (Mercury and Emerald play with a sock puppet of Cinder), Cinder "Stalls" (Cinder tries to stall Junior Detectives Sun and Neptune while the rest of her team hides her evil plans), Cinder "Lols" (Cinder laughs at Mercury and Emerald falling down the stairs) and Cinder "Bawls" (Cinder cries openly as world peace is achieved and everyone frolics about happily).; Note: All the segments are based on fan comics, whose authors get story credits.
22	22	"Security Woes"	Kerry Shawcross	Tom Alvarado, Kerry Shawcross and Miles Luna	4:10	October 1, 2016	N/A
"Game Night" – Jaune brings a board game called Compost King to entertain his teammates, but they refuse to follow the boring rules, and instead make up their own.; "Security Woes" – At an airport, Cinder and Emerald get through security without an issue, but Mercury gets held up at the metal detectors and x-ray machine due to his prosthetic legs.; "Floor Is Lava" – Ruby steadfastly claims that the floor is lava. Her teammates reluctantly play along, with Weiss using her Semblance and Yang launching herself with the Ember Celica, but Roman refuses to humor her. He immediately melts into the floor, to the surprise of everyone but Ruby, who simply says that she warned Roman.
23	23	"A Slip Through Time and Space"	Kerry Shawcross	Kerry Shawcross and Miles Luna	4:50	October 8, 2016	N/A
"The Great Dust Robbery" – Neptune's "crime senses" are tingling. While Neptune and Sun obliviously try to divine what crime is occurring, Roman and Neo hold up and rob a Dust store right next to them.; "Dance Practice" – Pyrrha and Yang talk about the "spontaneous" synchronized dance Team JNPR performed at the Beacon Dance. Pyrrha privately remembers the grueling preparations the team actually went through in order to perfect their routine thanks to Ren.; "A Slip Through Time and Space" – Ruby makes Nora a cup of coffee, but Ren warns her too late that Nora has too much energy and is not allowed any more caffeine. Having drunk the entire pot, Nora falls to the floor and slides through multiple different parallel universes where characters are swapped and things are slightly different, to finally a scene where Nora's voice actress, Samantha Ireland, finishes a recording session. When Nora finally regains consciousness, she finds herself stuck in a universe where Ren talks with Ruby's voice and Zwei talks with Jaune's.
24	24	"The One with a Laugh Track"	Kerry Shawcross	Miles Luna and Kerry Shawcross	4:54	October 15, 2016	N/A
The cast performs in a sitcom-esque episode, complete with laugh track and a commercial break, where Pyrrha (very reluctantly) advertises Pumpkin Pete's Marshmallow Flakes, followed by Roman and Neo advertising Neo's Neo, an ice cream flavor which they deny being poison. The episode ends in the style of Saturday Night Live, where the cast gathers together and Ruby thanks everyone, acknowledges the band playing, and invites the viewers back for the next season.

=== Season 2 (2017) ===
No. overall	No. in season	Title	Directed by	Written by	Length	Original release date	U.S. viewers (millions)
25	1	"Director Ozpin"	Miles Luna, Kerry Shawcross, and Gray Haddock	Tom Alvarado and Miles Luna	3:46	May 13, 2017	2.31
"Director Ozpin" – The opening titles are sabotaged by Mercury and Emerald. Ozpin assures Team RWBY such sabotage is impossible as long as he is present. As Team RWBY leave, Ozpin is trapped underneath the RWBY crest by Cinder.; "UFO" – Jaune, Nora, and Pyrrha play an alien abduction game, using Pyrrha's shield as the flying saucer. Pyrrha accidentally sneezes, causing her to drop to shield on the toy cows, squishing them, and causing Nora to start bawling uncontrollably.; "Dodgeball" – Penny is invited to play dodgeball but her behavior makes Neptune suspicious. Penny wins the game using her targeting system, causing Yang to angrily throw the ball back so hard it knocks Penny's head off. Neptune continues to believe something about Penny is suspicious.
26	2	"Geist Buster"	Gray Haddock, Koen Wooten and Kerry Shawcross	Tom Alvarado	3:08	May 20, 2017	1.92
"Book Lovers" – Ruby and Yang ask Blake for her books, only to use them to construct a makeshift fort in a battle with Jaune and Ren.; "Shiny Badge" – Neptune struggles to keep his Junior Detective badge clean, while Sun discretely keeps his shiny by putting peanut butter on the badge and having Zwei lick it off.; "Geist Buster" – Roman and Neo unleash a Geist to attack various Beacon students, only for it to be eaten by Nora after it possesses Ren's pancakes.
27	3	"Magic Show"	Patrick Rodriguez, Dustin Matthews and Koen Wooten	Tom Alvarado and Miles Luna	3:58	May 27, 2017	1.62
"Magic Show" – Ruby and Jaune compete against each other in a magic show, with Jaune able to best Ruby by pulling Velvet out of his hat, only for her to angrily pull on his ears as payback.; "Find a Penny" – Pyrrha finds a penny on the ground and decides to keep it for good luck. Meanwhile, Ruby carries her own kind of Penny.; "Kick-Off" – The heroes and villains face off against each other in a soccer match, but once the game starts, Mercury accidentally deflates the only ball they have.
28	4	"Dad Jokes"	Gray Haddock, Miles Luna and Koen Wooten	Tom Alvarado and Miles Luna	2:58	June 3, 2017	1.45
"Neptune's Game" – Ren and Sun watch Neptune play a video game he's good at, until Neptune runs into his online rival and loses. The rival secretly turns out to be Sun.; "Snaps" – Velvet takes a picture of Crescent Rose and goes through several different color filters, before deciding that no filter is the best one.; "Dad Jokes" – Yang, Ren, Sun, and Neptune find Nora in a food coma for eating too many waffles, with Yang making lame puns as a result. Taiyang then arrives to bring his own "Dad jokes" into the mix, causing Ren, Sun, and Neptune to quickly flee, while Yang and Taiyang continue to joke around.
29	5	"Girls Rock!"	Kerry Shawcross and Miles Luna	Tom Alvarado and Miles Luna	3:50	June 10, 2017	1.94
"Fearless Hero" – Velvet is cornered by the villains, but is saved by a masked vigilante called "The Hunts-Man" (who is actually Jaune wearing Ruby's cape and is equipped with Yang's Ember Celica and Nora's Magnihild). Jaune quickly has to run when the girls angrily find out their belongings are missing.; "Whistle" – Zwei acts up and starts chewing on a book, while Ruby, Yang, and Weiss look on. Unable to control him, Ruby is forced to blow her dog whistle, but it causes an angered Blake and Velvet to quickly intervene and knock the whistle out of Ruby's hand, as they are affected by it as well.; "Girls Rock!" – Team RWBY and Nora decide to form a band to participate in the upcoming battle of the bands event, but are interrupted by Tai during practice.
30	6	"Super Besties"	Kerry Shawcross, Patrick Rodriguez and Gray Haddock	Tom Alvarado and Miles Luna	4:00	June 17, 2017	2.51
"Super Besties" – Ruby hypnotizes her teammates while they sleep at night.; "Rat in the Hat" – Roman impatiently waits for his hat to get dry-cleaned.; "Meet the Author" – Ruby and Blake go to the bookstore in which Blake's favorite author is doing a book signing. To Blake's distress, the author turns out to be Zwei.
31	7	"Must Be Nice"	Gray Haddock, Luis "Paco" Vazque and Miles Luna	Story by : Tom Alvarado, Miles Luna and Kerry Shawcross; Teleplay by : Tom Alvarado and Miles Luna	4:34	June 24, 2017	1.85
"Late for Class" – Ruby does multiple attempts to sneak into Oobleck's class, only for him to give her detention every time.; "Must Be Nice" – Nora tells Weiss and Yang what the mental strain of being nice all the time does to people, which is demonstrated by Pyrrha.; "Evil Class" – Cinder tries to teach a class to the rest of the villains, which ends up in failure.
32	8	"Boy Band"	Gray Haddock, Kate Warner and Kerry Shawcross	Tom Alvarado and Miles Luna	3:08	July 1, 2017	1.64
"Pet Party" – Ruby tries to take Zwei to the veterinarian by convincing him that they're going to a "pet party", but Nora messes it up.; "Tai Dye" – Taiyang wears a tie-dye shirt and tries to make a joke about it, but his daughters are unimpressed.; "Boy Band" – Neptune, Ren, Sun, and Jaune form their own band for the Battle of the Bands, but Neptune suffers an allergic reaction to latex from Jaune's make-up.
33	9	"Coming Home to Roost"	Kerry Shawcross, Kate Warner and Koen Wooten	Story by : Tom Alvarado, Miles Luna and Kerry Shawcross; Teleplay by : Tom Alvarado and Miles Luna	3:00	July 8, 2017	2.03
"Coming Home to Roost" – Ruby announces to the rest of Team RWBY that Qrow is coming to visit. While Ruby and Yang talk about him, Qrow tries multiple attempts to fly through their dorm window.; "Read the Sign" – Various characters protest for many reasons with no clear goal while Neo teases the audience about her lack of a voice.; "Life Coach" – Yang teaches Jaune to be more assertive only for him to take it too far.
34	10	"Cool Dad"	Miles Luna, Joel Mann and Gray Haddock	Tom Alvarado	4:21	July 15, 2017	1.76
"Cool Uncle" – Tai is jealous of Qrow because his daughters follow him wherever he goes.; "Clean Behind the Ears" – Floyd tries to torment Neptune while he sleeps, but he ends up possessing a brush that Sun uses for showering.; "Cool Dad" – Tai once again tries to upstage Qrow, but his daughters manage to talk him out of it, saying that he's the best dad they could ever have. Off to the side Qrow states that his "Job is done", but Velvet, whom Qrow calls 'Bunny Girl', points out that he did absolutely nothing.
35	11	"Movie Night"	Patrick Rodriguez and Millvette Gonzalez	Tom Alvarado and Kerry Shawcross	3:00	July 22, 2017	1.42
"Movie Night" – The characters have trouble deciding which movie they want to see: Pyrrha wants to watch "Love More Than Likely" (Pyrrha is "saved" from a Grimm by Jaune crashing into it on Zwei), Sun wants to watch "Try Hard 2: Try Harderer" (Junior Detective Sun get into a shootout with Roman Torchwick, Sun plays by his own rules from playing a board game with Neptune, and they walk away from an explosion behind them in slow motion, in an obvious parody of Die Hard), Velvet wants to see an animated children's musical (only for it to get immediately shot down by Sun), Jaune wants to watch "The Hunts-Man Rises" (Jaune monologues atop a building, much to the annoyance of Cinder, Emerald, and Mercury), and Ruby wants to see the "horror" movie "Dog Rain" (multiple Zweis fall from the sky). As Jaune questions how "Dog Rain" is a horror movie, the movie theater closes for the day.; "Wore It Best" – Neo tries on various outfits while Roman watches.
36	12	"Evil Genius"	Dustin Matthews and Zane Rutledge, and Paula Decanini	Story by : Tom Alvarado and Jarrett Blumenschein; Teleplay by : Tom Alvarado	4:32	July 29, 2017	1.67
"Dangerous Quests" – Ozpin sends his students to retrieve misplaced objects under the guise of retrieving artifacts.; "Tune-Up" – Professor Port observes his students as they work on their weapon maintenance, and praises them, except for Jaune who is simply hitting his weapon with an inflatable mallet.; "Evil Genius" – Roman tries and fails to use several different gadgets in hopes of defeating Ruby. He unknowingly defeats her when she slips on some frozen yogurt he dropped.
37	13	"Parent Teacher Conference"	Kate Warner, Andrew Caprotti and Paula Decanini	Tom Alvarado	4:11	August 5, 2017	2.38
"Parent Teacher Conference" – Taiyang and Qrow are called into a meeting with Ozpin regarding Ruby and Yang's misbehaviors, but then the father and uncle have an argument with each other, akin to a married couple.; "Blake's Beauty Vlog" – Sun helps Blake film a beauty vlog.; "Surprise Parties" – Ruby is planning to throw a surprise party for Pyrrha, but the rest of her team tell her that may be a bad idea, as all of her previous surprise parties went wrong, with the worst leading Professor Port to have a heart attack.
38	14	"Cannonball!"	Koen Wooten, Billy Burson III and Paula Decanini	Tom Alvarado and Miles Luna	4:55	August 12, 2017	2.18
"Cannonball" – Penny arrives at the pool looking for Ruby. She is then encouraged by Jaune and Sun to do a cannonball, but she jumps up high in the air and lands hard on Ruby's head.; "Winter Is Coming" – While the rest of Team RWBY goes out to spend quality time with their friends and family, Weiss patiently waits for Winter to arrive. She does eventually, although still imploring Weiss to follow her strict military standards.; "Inner Lives of Beowolves" – A couple of Beowolves named Mike and Marty get bored of listening to Cinder's evil plan, and decide to have coffee together. They then get annoyed by a Geist named Floyd.
39	15	"Nurse Nora"	Eric Tello and Luis "Paco" Vazquez	Tom Alvarado	3:21	August 19, 2017	1.80
"Sister Stuff" – The different sisterly routines between Weiss and Winter and Ruby and Yang are shown.; "Nurse Nora" – A parody of Misery, a mentally unstable Nora forces an injured Ren to pretend that his leg is not broken.
40	16	"Neptune Noir"	Miles Luna, Brian Arndt and Kerry Shawcross	Tom Alvarado and Miles Luna	4:13	August 26, 2017	1.23
"Neptune Noir" – In a film noir-style setting, Junior Detective Neptune is approached by Cinder who tries to hire him as an investigator, but is put off by his flirtatious behavior.; "Man Up with Port" – Port teaches the viewers how to survive in the wild starting off with building a fort. Winter arrives and effortlessly creates a cabin with her Glyph.; "Tai's Tech Vlog" – Taiyang tries filming some vlogs of his own, but breaks each of his cameras through various means, including attaching the camera to Zwei who runs away and when Qrow crashes into a drone camera in his bird form.
41	17	"The Mystery Bunch"	Dustin Matthews, Koen Wooten and Joel Mann	Tom Alvarado and Miles Luna	3:43	September 2, 2017	1.39
"Rolling Thunder" – Jaune, Ren, Sun, and Neptune go rolling skating, with Jaune and Neptune having trouble balancing while Sun boasts to them about his superior roller skating skills. His tail ends up getting run over by Ruby.; "Computer Virus" – Ozpin, Port, Oobleck, and Winter are trying to figure out a computer virus while a sick Penny walks by.; "The Mystery Bunch" – Junior Detectives Sun and Neptune find out that there is another group solving their cases, which turns out to be Team JNPR and Zwei in an obvious parody of Scooby-Doo.
42	18	"The Fixer"	Miles Luna and Gary Crane	Tom Alvarado	3:28	September 9, 2017	1.26
"The Fixer" – Taiyang tries to act like he can fix anything, despite his daughters' pleas telling him not to. Later on, Ruby and Yang distract him by asking him to fix a computer virus.; "Jr. She-Tectives" – Sun and Neptune find out that Pyrrha and Nora also became junior detectives, as well as being better than they at their job.
43	19	"Steals and Wheels"	Gray Haddock, Zane Rutledge and Kate Warner	Tom Alvarado	4:08	September 16, 2017	1.34
"Yang Boops" – Neptune tells Yang that she is acting unladylike, even going as far as calling her a tomboy, which results in Yang punching him.; "Steals and Wheels" – Roman and Neo try to start up several faulty businesses, including toxic energy drinks, run-down vehicles, and a fake lawyer firm.; "Fugitive" – Jaune thinks that he might have stolen a candy bar from the store and is pursued by Sun and Neptune. Just as Jaune goes on the run, it is revealed that the Junior Detectives intended on returning his forgotten wallet.
44	20	"Monsters of Rock"	Kerry Shawcross, Patrick Rodriguez and Dustin Matthews	Tom Alvarado	2:48	September 23, 2017	1.09
"The Ride Along" – Jaune tags along with Sun and Neptune while they're on Junior Detective business.; "The Great Escape" – Winter tutors Yang and Ruby on how to properly escape from an escape room, despite Yang punching through walls. Qrow also teaches Jaune, Ren, and Sun while in their own escape room.; "Monsters of Rock" – Roman forms a band with Emerald, Mercury, Neo, and others to participate in the upcoming battle of the bands event, much to Cinder's annoyance.
45	21	"Happy BirthdayWeen"	Eric Tello, Billy Burson III & Gary Crane, and Miles Luna	Eric Tello, Billy Burson III & Gary Crane, and Miles Luna	3:02	September 30, 2017	1.58
"The Geist Pumpkin" – Ruby and Yang bring home a pumpkin, only for Floyd the Geist to possess it when they're not looking. Eventually, the sisters use it to make a pumpkin pie, unaware that Floyd is still possessing it.; "Devotion Potion" – Nora makes a love potion with a secret ingredient, which turns out to be Ren.; "Happy BirthdayWeen" – Ruby's birthday happens to be on the same day as Halloween, and she uses it as an excuse to take advantage of her friends. Having enough with her antics, when Ruby ask her friends for a free costume, they give her a trashcan.
46	22	"Battle of the Bands"	Kerry Shawcross	Tom Alvarado	3:57	October 7, 2017	1.43
The Battle of the Bands event is about to begin, with Ozpin announcing the groups about to participate: Puns and Roses (consisting of Team RWBY and Nora), the Nep-Tunes (consisting of Jaune, Ren, Sun and Neptune), Trouble Clef (consisting of Roman, Neo, Emerald, Mercury, a Beowolf and a Geist) and P3N-3 (Penny as a disc jockey). Just as Trouble Clef is about to perform, the event turns out to be a literal battle of the bands, in which the participants all fight each other using their weapons and musical instruments. Amidst the chaos, Ruby thanks the audience for joining them for another season, before getting accidentally knocked out by Nora.
47	23	"A Slip Through Time and Space Pt. 2"	Connor Pickens and Kerry Shawcross	Kerry Shawcross	3:40	November 27, 2017	1.31
Nora takes a concentrated dose of coffee and slips into a parallel universe where the "Giant Ones" worship the characters through merchandise. There, Jaune tells her of the "Great One" and gives her the choice between two shirts, "Blue vs. Red" and "Red vs. Blue", before she retreats back into one of the toy boxes and regains consciousness in the normal world.
48	24	"Nondescript Holiday Spectacular"	Miles Luna	Miles Luna	3:34	December 14, 2017	1.26
Parodying How the Grinch Stole Christmas!, Roman uses a new gadget to suck the holiday spirit out of everyone else and make them miserable. However, while this removes their love for the holidays, it has no effect on their usual cheer and kindheartedness. After accidentally tearing the sack open, Roman's heart grows three times bigger, and he decides to return everyone's holiday spirit. He is then taken to the hospital due to his heart literally oversizing.

=== Season 3 (2018) ===
No. overall	No. in season	Title	Directed by	Written by	Length	Original release date	U.S. viewers (millions)
49	1	"Road Trip"	Paula Decanini	Tom Alvarado	3:45	January 27, 2018	1.60
"Road Trip" – Team RWBY takes a road trip, but they leave Jaune and Ren behind. The two boys are then picked up by Cinder, but Jaune sings the Camp Camp theme song to annoy Cinder until she throws them out of her car. Meanwhile, Team RWBY ends up accidentally robbing a bank.; "Manly Weapons" – Port films another segment of his show, but Velvet shows up and makes fun of him.
50	2	"Evil Interview"	Paula Decanini	Tom Alvarado	3:32	February 3, 2018	1.31
"Evil Interview" – Cinder interviews Cardin to see if he qualifies for joining her. Mercury angrily demands a raise and a fancy hat, causing him to be set on fire by Cinder. Cardin nervously turns down the job offer.; "Love Daddy" – Taiyang gets help from his family to set up an online dating profile, but his first match happens to be Cinder.
51	3	"Mortal Frenemies"	Paula Decanini	Tom Alvarado	3:34	February 10, 2018	1.93
"One Shot One Pill" – Taiyang tries to get Zwei to take his medicine, but Ruby and Yang have a more effective solution.; "Mortal Frenemies" – Qrow constantly antagonizes Winter over various things.
52	4	"Grimm Passengers"	Paula Decanini and Zane Rutledge	Story by : Tom Alvarado and Zane Rutledge; Teleplay by : Tom Alvarado, Miles Luna and Zane Rutledge	3:36	February 17, 2018	1.11
"Grimm Passengers" – The Beowolves Mike and Marty try to pose as humans in hopes of getting a car ride.; "Punished" – Yang and Taiyang continuously make puns, aggravating both Weiss and Blake. Ruby then delivers a public service announcement to the audience against the usage of puns.
53	5	"Girls' Night Out"	Paula Decanini	Tom Alvarado	3:21	February 24, 2018	1.36
"Mercury's Girl" – Mercury talks to a sockpuppet of Cinder while his allies watch him.; "Girls' Night Out" – Team RWBY all prepare to go out together. Jaune asks if he and Ren can come along, but is rejected. Team RWBY ends up burning a building, with mixed reactions within the group.
54	6	"Teenage Faunus Ninja Catgirl"	Paula Decanini	Tom Alvarado	3:23	March 3, 2018	1.48
"Teenage Faunus Ninja Catgirl" – Blake secretly pursues Ruby using ninja-like tactics. It is eventually revealed that Blake just wanted her book back from her.; "The Protege " – Roman teaches Cardin how to be a criminal.
55	7	"Mysterious Red Button"	Paula Decanini	Tom Alvarado	3:33	March 10, 2018	1.15
"Books Fix Everything" – Oobleck has his students read books to solve their problems, such as giving Ren a cookbook or Yang a pun book.; "Mysterious Red Button" – Various characters come across a red button that does different things for each of them: Blake gets a fish that falls from the sky, Ruby turns the lights on and off, Jaune and Ren get clones of themselves, Cinder and Roman get booby trapped, and Sun ends the episode immediately despite Neptune's doubts.
56	8	"Kids vs Adults vs Pups"	Paula Decanini	Story by : Tom and Amelie Alvarado; Teleplay by : Tom and Amelie Alvarado	3:50	March 17, 2018	1.36
"Kids vs Adults vs Pups" – Ozpin and Winter muse about how Team RWBY acts, while Team RWBY does the same thing vice versa. Zwei imagines how he thinks Team RWBY acts.; "Fireflies" – Penny takes Ruby out to see fireflies.
57	9	"Tea Party"	Paula Decanini	Kerry Shawcross and Tom Alvarado	4:11	June 30, 2018	0.45
"Tea Party" – Weiss hosts a tea party to introduce her friends to her butler Klein and his multiple personalities.; "Leisurely Stroll of Doom" – Ruby is delighted to spend the entire day with Qrow until she remembers his Semblance causes misfortune to follow him wherever he goes.
58	10	"Prank War"	Paula Decanini	Tom Alvarado	4:05	July 7, 2018	0.53
"Sailor Jaune" – Jaune has difficulty changing into his "Hunts-Man" superhero costume to help someone in trouble, mimicking the styles of Superman, Wonder Woman, and Sailor Moon. When he finally succeeds, he learns the distressed citizen has already left out of impatience.; "Prank War" – Mercury and Emerald pass the time with a contest to see which of them can pull the best prank. Emerald eventually declares herself the victor by selling Mercury out for his prank against Cinder.
59	11	"In the Clutches of Evil"	Paula Decanini	Tom Alvarado	4:09	July 14, 2018	0.70
"In the Clutches of Evil" – The Hunts-Man (Jaune) is rescued from an evil trap machine by the super heroine "Red Huntress" (Pyrrha), but he completely misreads the situation and declares her to be his mortal enemy. However, Pyrrha is happy that she now has Jaune's undivided attention.; "Put It in Reverse" – Ruby has a disastrous driving lesson with Taiyang, with a series of flashbacks playing out in reverse to reveal how the fiasco started.
60	12	"JNPR Dreams"	Paula Decanini	Kerry Shawcross and Tom Alvarado	3:41	July 21, 2018	0.80
"QrowCrow Part 1" – Qrow becomes partially stuck in his crow form after changing his head back to normal.; "JNPR Dreams" – The members of Team JNPR enjoy their own happy dreams at night: Nora receives a stack of pancakes and a love letter from Ren; Ren lounges in a pool chair for hours; Pyrrha fends a pack of Beowolves off side-by-side with an attentive Jaune; and Jaune gains the praise and admiration of everyone at Beacon Academy.; "QrowCrow Part 2" – Qrow turns to Ozpin to reverse his transformation, but Ozpin only manages to turn him into a human with a crow's head and refuses to help him further.
61	13	"Cousins of Chaos"	Paula Decanini	Tom Alvarado	3:53	July 28, 2018	0.41
"Don't Pet the Grimm" – In a parody of Dr. Seuss, Ozpin discourages Penny from making friends with Mike the Beowolf.; "Cousins of Chaos" – Jaune tries to prove his rebellious attitude so he can join Sun, Neptune, and Ren's new biker gang.
62	14	"Nefarious Dreams"	Paula Decanini	Tom Alvarado	3:43	August 4, 2018	0.79
"Nefarious Dreams" – Roman, Emerald, and Mercury each have a dream where Cinder is loyal and obedient to them, while Cinder dreams of replacing them all with copies of herself, only for the copies to turn on her. Cinder wakes up feeling more appreciative of her henchmen, but takes it back after overhearing their dreams about her.; "Tai's Escape" – Taiyang pretends to be stuck in the escape room to enjoy some quality time to himself.
63	15	"Play with Penny"	Paula Decanini	Tom Alvarado	3:48	August 11, 2018	0.67
"Play with Penny" – Beacon Academy is being terrorized by a giant monster that Ruby and her friends are unable to fight. Penny asks Ruby to come play with her, but when Ruby tells her they cannot until the current problem is solved, Penny easily fells the monster and drags Ruby away, leaving the others to clean the mess.; "Life Hacks" – Oobleck gives his students a vigorous lesson against relying on life hacks. When asked for a less strenuous alternative, he suggests his own life hack of drinking coffee and flies away in a caffeine rush.; "Animal Cruelty" – Cardin spends time hitting small animals with rocks. One of the animals he hits is a transformed Qrow, who punches him out cold in retaliation.
64	16	"RWBY Dreams"	Paula Decanini	Kerry Shawcross and Tom Alvarado	4:03	August 18, 2018	1.04
"Tough Customer" – Klein orders a bowl of noodles, but his order is convoluted by his multiple personalities.; "RWBY Dreams" – The dreams of Team RWBY's members are shown: Blake sees her friends swimming around her in midair, and eats a rotten fish that gives her food poisoning; Yang rebelliously escapes from authority figures on a flying, rainbow-trailing Bumblebee; Weiss is dismayed that she has become a "know-it-all" after learning every possible thing; and Ruby has an encounter with the non-chibi version of herself from the original RWBY series.

=== Neon Konbini (2021) ===
No. overall	No. in season	Title	Directed by	Written by	Length	Original release date	U.S. viewers (millions)
65	1	"Cool as Coco"	Paula Decanini	Tom Alvarado	1:58	May 27, 2021	N/A
A group of the school's "coolest" individuals – Qrow, Winter, Ren, Cinder, and Neptune – gather and recount what makes them "cool". A new "threat" to the group presents itself as the upperclassmen Coco Adel, as she is significantly "cooler" than the group. Some members of the group run off to learn from Coco, leaving Qrow and Cinder by themselves.
66	2	"True Blue Friend"	Paula Decanini	Tom Alvarado	0:49	June 3, 2021	N/A
Velvet is sitting alone outside, looking depressed when Coco strolls by and asks her what's wrong. Coco tries to offer help to Velvet, trying to figure out what is wrong (like if Cardin is bullying her); but Velvet says she needs to ride it out to feel better. Coco is sad that she isn't able to help Velvet, but offers to sit with her until she feels better.
67	3	"Master Thief"	Paula Decanini	Tom Alvarado	0:57	June 10, 2021	N/A
A string of thefts, caused by Emerald, occur. Victims include Coco & her purse, Qrow & his clothes. Nora & Pyrrha team up as "Junior She-tectives" to find out who is causing all of these robberies while falling victim to the thief themselves. Pyrrha manages to catch Emerald, but Nora is oblivious to the fact that she was the thief.
68	4	"Behind the Scenes"	Paula Decanini	Tom Alvarado	1:49	June 17, 2021	N/A
Professor Ozpin gives viewers a look at how RWBY Chibi is made in an exclusive tour of the show's production.
69	5	"He Does it All"	Paula Decanini	Tom Alvarado	1:33	June 17, 2021	N/A
Klein's different personas cause "havoc" around Beacon Academy, specifically surrounding Team RWBY (with the exception of Weiss). Team "RBY" confronts Weiss; however, it turns out his "havoc" was actually him doing favors for each member of the team. They end the episode cheering for Klein, leaving Weiss confused.
70	6	"Port's Fort"	Paula Decanini	Tom Alvarado	0:55	June 24, 2021	N/A
Jaune, Ren, Sun and Neptune attempt to make their way into Professor Port's secret man cave.
71	7	"Cardin's Club"	Paula Decanini	Tom Alvarado	1:09	June 24, 2021	N/A
Cardin is trying to host his "Cardin's Cool Club", but it's empty besides Penny. He thinks he is the most popular guy in school (due to his "pranks everyone loves"). A montage of his various pranks then follows, featuring other characters like: Pyrrha, Neptune, Coco, & Yang. He then sees Jaune (calling him "Jone"), and asks him why no one wants to join the club. Jaune is honest with Cardin, which results in Cardin going to bully Neptune for more money.
72	8	"Love Life"	Paula Decanini	Tom Alvarado	1:07	July 1, 2021	N/A
After being too focused on evil and her plans, Cinder tries speed-dating multiple characters, which mostly goes poorly. She finally gets the perfect date when she finds herself opposite a mirror, talking to herself.
73	9	"Tai the Sub"	Paula Decanini	Tom Alvarado	1:50	July 8, 2021	N/A
Ruby and Yang are mortified when Tai comes to their class as a substitute teacher for the day, more so when Tai, claiming to "get today's youth", teaches their lessons through hip hop music.
74	10	"Bad Criminal"	Paula Decanini	Tom Alvarado	1:28	July 15, 2021	N/A
Pyrrha goes to great lengths to try and get Jaune's attention by becoming the criminal vigilante, the Red Huntress.
