= Haloid =

Haloid may refer to:

- The Haloid Photographic Company, now known as Xerox Corporation
- Haloid, an animation by Monty Oum published on GameTrailers in 2007
- Haloid Solutions, the Wireless communication company
