= RWBY =

American animated web series

- Genre: Action; Adventure; Science fantasy
- Created by: Monty Oum
- Written by: Miles Luna; Kerry Shawcross; Monty Oum (vol. 1–3); Kiersi Burkhart (from vol. 7); Eddy Rivas (from vol. 7)
- Directed by: Monty Oum (vol. 1–2); Kerry Shawcross (from vol. 3)
- Voices of: Lindsay Jones; Kara Eberle; Arryn Zech; Barbara Dunkelman; Miles Luna; Samantha Ireland; Jen Brown; Monty Oum; Neath Oum
- Theme music composer: Jeff Williams
- Opening theme: "This Will Be the Day" (vol. 1); "Time to Say Goodbye" (vol. 2); "When It Falls" (vol. 3); "Let's Just Live" (vol. 4); "The Triumph" (vol. 5); "Rising" (vol. 6); "Trust Love" (vol. 7); "For Every Life" (vol. 8); "Inside" (vol. 9)
- Composers: Jeff Williams (vol. 1–8); Steve Goldshein (vol. 1–3); Alex Abraham (vol. 1–8); Casey Lee Williams (vol. 6, 9); Martin Gonzalez (vol. 9)
- Country of origin: United States
- Original language: English
- No. of seasons: 9
- No. of episodes: 117 (list of episodes)

Production
- Executive producers: Matt Hullum; Burnie Burns; Kerry Shawcross (from vol. 6)
- Producers: Gray G. Haddock (vol. 2); Koen Wooten (vol. 3–5)
- Running time: 4–28 minutes
- Production company: Rooster Teeth Animation (vol. 1–9)

Original release
- Network: Rooster Teeth
- Release: July 18, 2013 – March 27, 2021
- Network: Crunchyroll
- Release: February 18, 2023 – March 30, 2024

Related
- RWBY Chibi; RWBY: Ice Queendom; Justice League x RWBY: Super Heroes & Huntsmen

RWBY (pronounced "Ruby") is an American animated web series created by Monty Oum for Rooster Teeth. It is set in the fictional world of Remnant, where young people train to become warriors ("Huntsmen" and "Huntresses") to protect their world from monsters called Grimm. The name RWBY is derived from the four main protagonists' forenames: Ruby Rose, Weiss Schnee, Blake Belladonna, and Yang Xiao Long, and their respective thematic colors (red, white, black, and yellow).

Following several promotional trailers, the first episode was screened at Rooster Teeth's convention, RTX, and premiered on their website on July 18, 2013. Subsequent episodes were released weekly, first to Rooster Teeth subscribers and then to YouTube a week later. Following Oum's death in 2015 during the production of the third season (stylized as volumes), there was an overall shift in the series' production and release schedule. Despite the death of its creator, the remaining crew members confirmed their intention to continue the series. Following the eighth volume, the series was moved to Crunchyroll. Volume 9 premiered on Crunchyroll on February 18, 2023. In March 2024, with the announcement of Rooster Teeth's shutdown, plans were made to sell the IP rights to RWBY, among other Rooster Teeth properties. On July 5, 2024, Viz Media was announced to have acquired the RWBY IP. A tenth volume of the series is in production.

RWBY received positive reviews from critics. The series has been dubbed in Japanese and broadcast by Tokyo MX in Japan, in partnership with Warner Bros. Japan, and has spawned several spin-off media, such as the video games RWBY: Grimm Eclipse and RWBY: Arrowfell, the animated series RWBY Chibi and RWBY: Ice Queendom, and the two-part direct-to-video film Justice League x RWBY: Super Heroes & Huntsmen.

== Synopsis ==
=== Background ===
The story takes place in the fictional world of Remnant, composed of four kingdoms (Vale, Mistral, Atlas, and Vacuo) under constant assault by monsters known as the Creatures of Grimm. Prior to the events of the series, the world was overseen by two opposing brothers, the Gods of Light and Darkness. Humanity was destroyed by the gods due to the actions of Salem, a vengeful woman cursed with immortality for trying to manipulate them into reviving her beloved Ozma. Ozma was subsequently reincarnated by the Gods to guide a new human race toward harmony and eventually summon the gods back for judgement using four relics, leading to an endless conflict between him and Salem, who hopes that an unfavorable judgement by the gods will allow her to die. The discovery of the element Dust triggered a technological and industrial revolution for humanity.

The gods themselves come from a separate world called the Ever After. Having been created by the Ever After's Great Tree to help it make that world, the brothers' arguments forced the Tree to exile them, left to create and experiment until they understood the true nature of balance. This eventually led to their creation of Remnant.

In the present day, Ozma has gifted four "Maidens" magical powers, distinct from Semblances, unique abilities tied to a person's soul. Keeping Salem's existence known to a select few, one of Ozma's incarnations, Ozpin, establishes academies in the four kingdoms to train Huntsmen and Huntresses against the Grimm, with each academy concealing one relic.

=== Plot ===
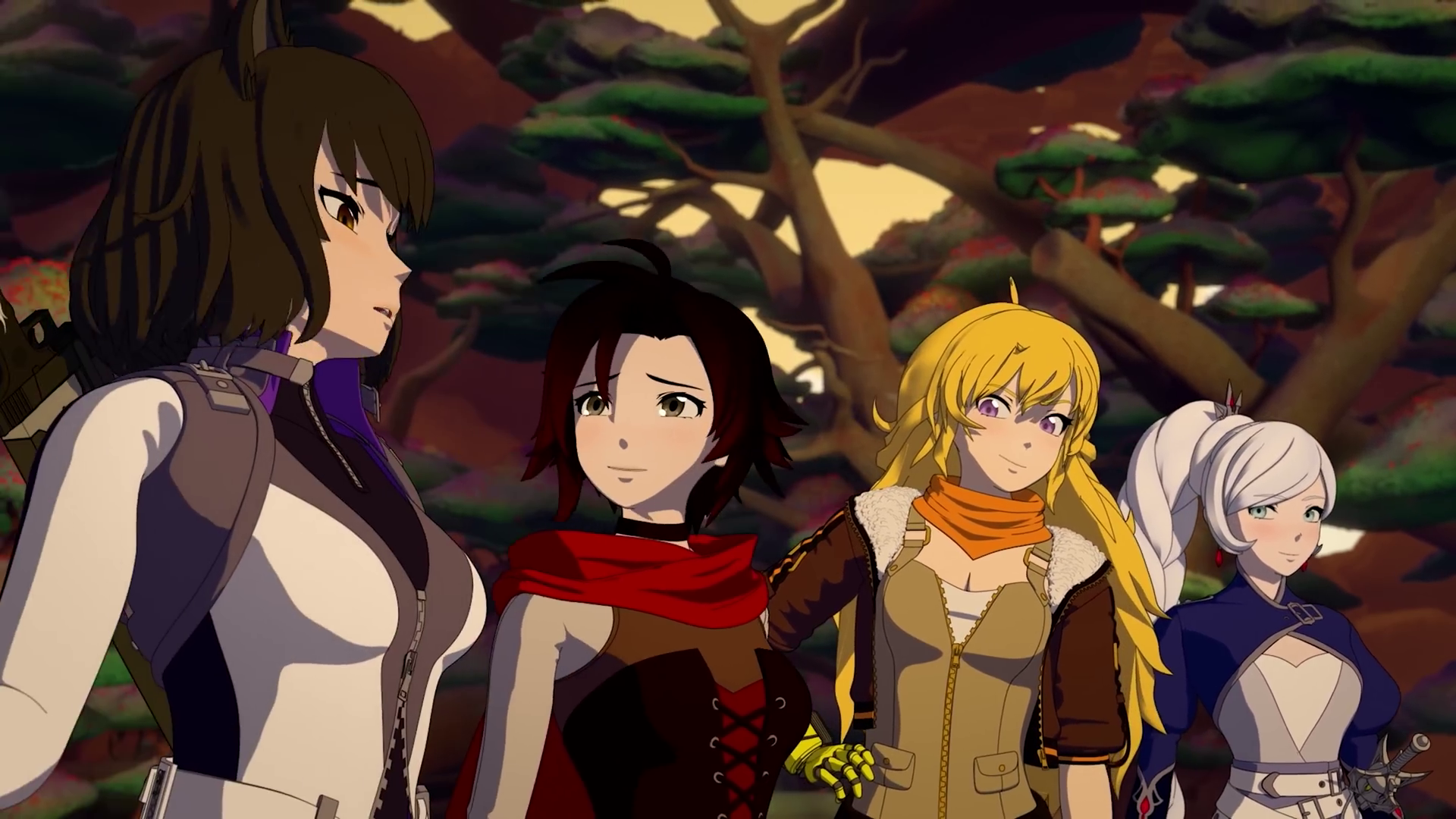
Team RWBY as they appear in Volume 9: Blake Belladonna, Ruby Rose, Yang Xiao Long, and Weiss Schnee.

The series focuses on Team RWBY (pronounced "ruby"), four girls attending Beacon Academy in Vale: Ruby Rose, Weiss Schnee, Blake Belladonna, and Yang Xiao Long. Their friends Jaune Arc, Nora Valkyrie, Pyrrha Nikos, and Lie Ren form their own team, JNPR (pronounced "juniper"). Ruby and Jaune become leaders of their respective teams. Blake reveals herself as a Faunus (a humanoid species possessing animal traits) and former member of the militant White Fang. After several clashes with the protagonists, Salem minion Cinder Fall, her ally Roman Torchwick, his assistant Neopolitan, and the White Fang under Adam Taurus invade Beacon. Penny Polendina, an android friend of Ruby's, is destroyed at the outset, and Roman is killed in the chaos. Yang loses her arm trying to protect Blake from Adam. Cinder assumes the power of the Fall Maiden, and kills Ozpin and Pyrrha, but is forced to retreat by Ruby using a divine power associated with her silver eyes.

The members of team RWBY separate. Ruby travels to Haven Academy in Mistral with her uncle Qrow Branwen, Nora, Jaune, and Ren. Weiss is forcefully returned home to Atlas by her abusive father Jacques, Blake reconnects with her family and fights the influence of the White Fang in the Faunus territory of Menagerie, and Yang remains home in Patch struggling with post-traumatic stress disorder. Ruby's group is joined by Oscar Pine, Ozpin's new incarnation. Yang reunites with Weiss and has her mother Raven send them to Ruby and the others. Cinder believes that Raven harbors the Spring Maiden, not realizing it to be Raven herself, and strikes a deal with her to open the vault containing the Relic of Knowledge. Jaune unlocks his Semblance, Blake returns, and together Ruby's allies defeat Salem's followers to obtain the relic. They fall out with Ozpin when Jinn, the spirit within the Relic of Knowledge, reveals that Ozpin has no way to kill Salem. They meet ex-Huntress Maria Calavera, who helps Ruby control the power of her eyes. Blake is ambushed by Adam but kills him with Yang. After saving the city of Argus from a giant Grimm, Ruby's group departs for Atlas, while Salem plans to seize the relics.

Ruby's group arrives in the occupied city of Mantle, reunites with a rebuilt Penny, and is recruited by General James Ironwood who plans to inform the world about Salem. When Salem attacks, Ironwood betrays Ruby's allies and Mantle, attempting to abandon the rest of the world and save the floating city of Atlas itself and its relic. Despite overwhelming odds, Ruby warns Remnant about Salem. Penny becomes the Winter Maiden, but is infected by a computer virus by Salem's acolyte Arthur Watts. Team RWBY obtains the Staff of Creation, and guided by Ozpin uses its spirit Ambrosius to turn Penny into a human and evacuate Atlas into Vacuo through a portal, causing the city to fall. Cinder intercepts them, mortally wounding Penny, who has Jaune kill her in order to transfer her Maiden powers to Weiss' sister Winter. Cinder betrays Neo and sends her, Jaune and Team RWBY falling into the void in the portal. After defeating Ironwood with the Maiden powers, Winter joins the others in Vacuo. Cinder delivers both relics to Salem, leaving Ironwood and Watts to die in the falling city. Team RWBY, Jaune, and Neo find themselves in the Ever After, where they are forced to confront and ultimately come to terms with their feelings and losses, especially Ruby and Jaune, who blame themselves for the fall of Atlas and Penny's death respectively. They defeat and destroy the Curious Cat, one of the gods' early creations. Other than Neo, who makes peace with Roman's death and stays behind, they return to Remnant to find the world mobilized against Salem in Vacuo.

== Voice cast and characters ==
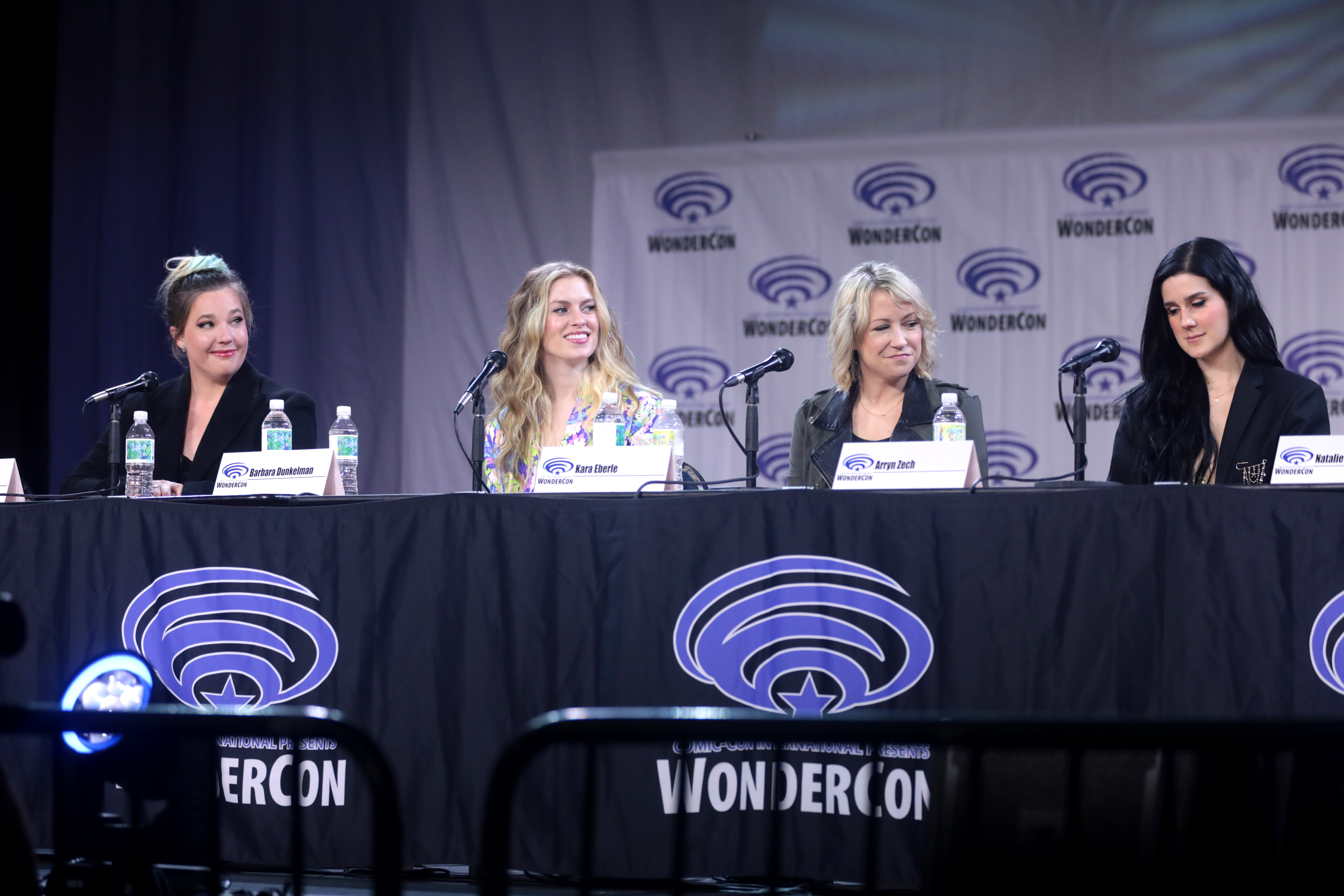
Lead voice actors: Lindsay Jones (voice of Ruby Rose), Barbara Dunkelman (voice of Yang Xiao Long), Kara Eberle (voice of Weiss Schnee), and Arryn Zech (voice of Blake Belladonna) at WonderCon 2023

Character	English	Japanese
Ruby Rose	Lindsay Jones	Saori Hayami
Weiss Schnee	Kara Eberle	Yoko Hikasa
Blake Belladonna	Arryn Zech	Yū Shimamura
Yang Xiao Long	Barbara Dunkelman	Ami Koshimizu
Jaune Arc	Miles Luna	Hiro Shimono
Nora Valkyrie	Samantha Ireland	Aya Suzaki
Pyrrha Nikos	Jen Brown	Megumi Toyoguchi (Volumes 1–2, 4); Shizuka Itō (Volume 3)
Lie Ren	Monty Oum (Volumes 1–2); Neath Oum (Volumes 3–present)	Soma Saito
Qrow Branwen	Vic Mignogna (Volumes 3–6); Jason Liebrecht (Volumes 7–present)	Hiroaki Hirata
Professor Ozpin	Shannon McCormick	Kazuhiko Inoue
Oscar Pine	Aaron Dismuke	Rie Kugimiya
Salem	Jen Taylor	Kikuko Inoue
Cinder Fall	Jessica Nigri	Yūko Kaida

== Episodes ==
Season	Episodes	Originally released	
Season	Episodes	First released	Last released
1	16	July 18, 2013	November 7, 2013
2	12	July 24, 2014	October 30, 2014
3	12	October 24, 2015	February 13, 2016
4	12	October 22, 2016	February 4, 2017
5	14	October 14, 2017	January 20, 2018
6	13	October 27, 2018	January 26, 2019
7	13	November 2, 2019	February 1, 2020
8	14	November 7, 2020	March 27, 2021
9	11	February 18, 2023	March 30, 2024

== Production and release ==
=== Development ===
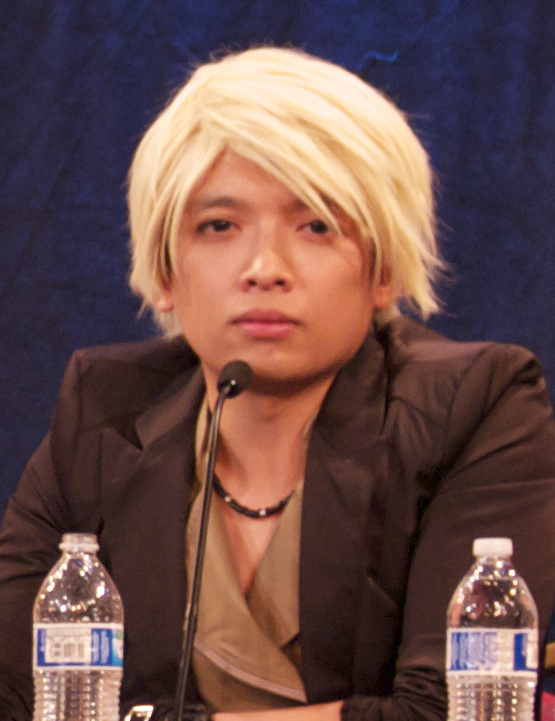
"My vision for the show was to present a two-dimensional, toon-shaded look, but with all of the depth and complexity of a 3D-animated production. I wanted to be able to move the cameras and characters freely while still capturing the essence of the flat, line-drawn look of traditional anime." —Monty Oum, the creator of RWBY, 2013

RWBY had been a long-standing concept of Oum's for years before it began development. Towards the end of his work on the tenth season of Rooster Teeth's Red vs. Blue, he developed the color-coding approach to character names and design as a hook for the series. During production on Red vs. Blue season 10, Oum asked series creator Burnie Burns if they could produce RWBY following the conclusion of that season. Burns, worried for the production schedule, told Oum "If you finish Season 10, then you can do whatever you want." Production on RWBY began as intended, with the first trailer being finished within two weeks and premiering after the credits of the Red vs. Blue season 10 finale on November 5, 2012.

Oum designed the characters with assistance from artist Ein Lee, utilizing designs inspired by classic fairy tale characters. Each character has an associated color, and it is the first letters of the main character's colors, red, white, black and yellow, that give the series its name. The series was originally written by Oum, along with fellow Rooster Teeth employees Miles Luna and Kerry Shawcross. Oum was initially concerned about a story focusing on female characters being developed by a primarily male crew, but said they managed to do well developing the female characters. Regarding the design, Oum wanted to "present a two-dimensional, toon-shaded look, but with all of the depth and complexity of a 3D-animated production". Volumes 1 to 3 were animated by the internal animation team of Rooster Teeth's studios in Austin using Smith Micro's Poser software, out of assets built on Autodesk Maya; however, starting with Volume 4, the production switched to using Maya entirely alongside additional modelling and animation being outsourced to the Monterrey-based studio CGBot. The series' music is composed by Jeff Williams, who previously composed the soundtracks for seasons 8–10 of Red vs. Blue, and features vocals by Williams' daughter, Casey Lee Williams.

=== Marketing ===
A series of four promotional trailers, one for each lead character, was released. They were primarily produced by Oum and assistant animator Shane Newville. Each trailer begins by unveiling one of the four primary characters and then showing a detailed action sequence. The "Red" trailer was shown after the credits for Red vs. Blue's season 10 finale in November 2012. It was followed by the "White" trailer in February 2013. The "Black" trailer was unveiled at a PAX East panel at the end of March and was the first to include voice-acted dialogue. Following the premiere of the "Black" trailer, Oum noted with regret that the first two trailers were shorter and had less character development. The "Yellow" trailer was shown at Rooster Teeth's A-Kon panel on June 1, 2013. Music from the trailers was sold as digital downloads at several online retailers.

On July 5, 2013, at the RWBY panel for their RTX 2013 event, Rooster Teeth premiered the first episode of RWBY, and would post the episode to their website on July 18.

=== Release ===
Following the premiere of RWBY in July 2013, Rooster Teeth released new episodes of the first season (stylized as volumes) weekly on their website, with access two hours early for their sponsors. In August 2013, streaming website Crunchyroll announced it would simulcast RWBY. The first volume ran for sixteen episodes and concluded on November 7, before being released on DVD and Blu-ray.

The second volume was first screened at RTX on July 4, 2014, before its premiere on July 24. The second volume consisted of twelve episodes, and concluded on October 30, before being released on DVD and Blu-ray. In February 2015, Rooster Teeth announced that both volumes of RWBY were released on Netflix. The third volume premiered on October 24, 2015, along with an episode of the RWBY spinoff series World of Remnant.

Starting with the fourth volume, Miles Luna and Kerry Shawcross were now the only writers for the series. The fourth volume premiered on October 22, 2016. In January 2017, a fifth volume was announced to be in development, and premiered on October 14, 2017. Following the conclusion of the fifth volume, Rooster Teeth First members would get episodes one week earlier than the general public for future releases.

In September 2018, Rooster Teeth announced that the sixth volume would be released exclusively on the company's website, which later premiered on October 27, 2018. This decision was made after many episodes of RWBY on YouTube were demonetized. The seventh volume premiered on November 2, 2019. On October 28, 2020, all episodes of RWBY, save the trailers, character shorts, and the pilot episode, were removed from YouTube in an effort to promote Rooster Teeth's website and mobile, TV and game console apps. Volume 8 premiered on November 7, 2020.

In January 2023, it was announced that the ninth volume would be released on Crunchyroll as part of a one-year exclusivity deal. The ninth volume premiered on February 18, 2023. It was later released on Rooster Teeth's website on March 30, 2024, alongside a bonus animatic episode that acts as an epilogue for the volume.

=== International release ===
The Blu-ray and DVD releases in Australia were handled by Hanabee Entertainment. The first volume was released in the UK by Animatsu Entertainment on May 4, 2015, on DVD.

On August 15, 2014, Rooster Teeth announced that a Japanese dub was being developed by Warner Bros. Home Entertainment Japan. Warner Bros. has also acquired local merchandising rights as well. The third volume was screened in select theaters on December 3, 2016. The fourth volume was released in select theaters for a limited two-week run from October 7 to 20, 2017. To promote the fourth volume, Volumes 1–3 were condensed into 12 episodes for broadcast on Tokyo MX and AbemaTV in July 2017 under the title RWBY 1–3: The Beginning. Over the course of the later half of 2021 the Japanese dub of Volume 5 through 8 were released on Blu-Ray on August 25, September 29, October 27 and December 22 respectively. The Japanese dub of Volume 9 released on Blu-Ray on October 25, 2023.

=== Music ===
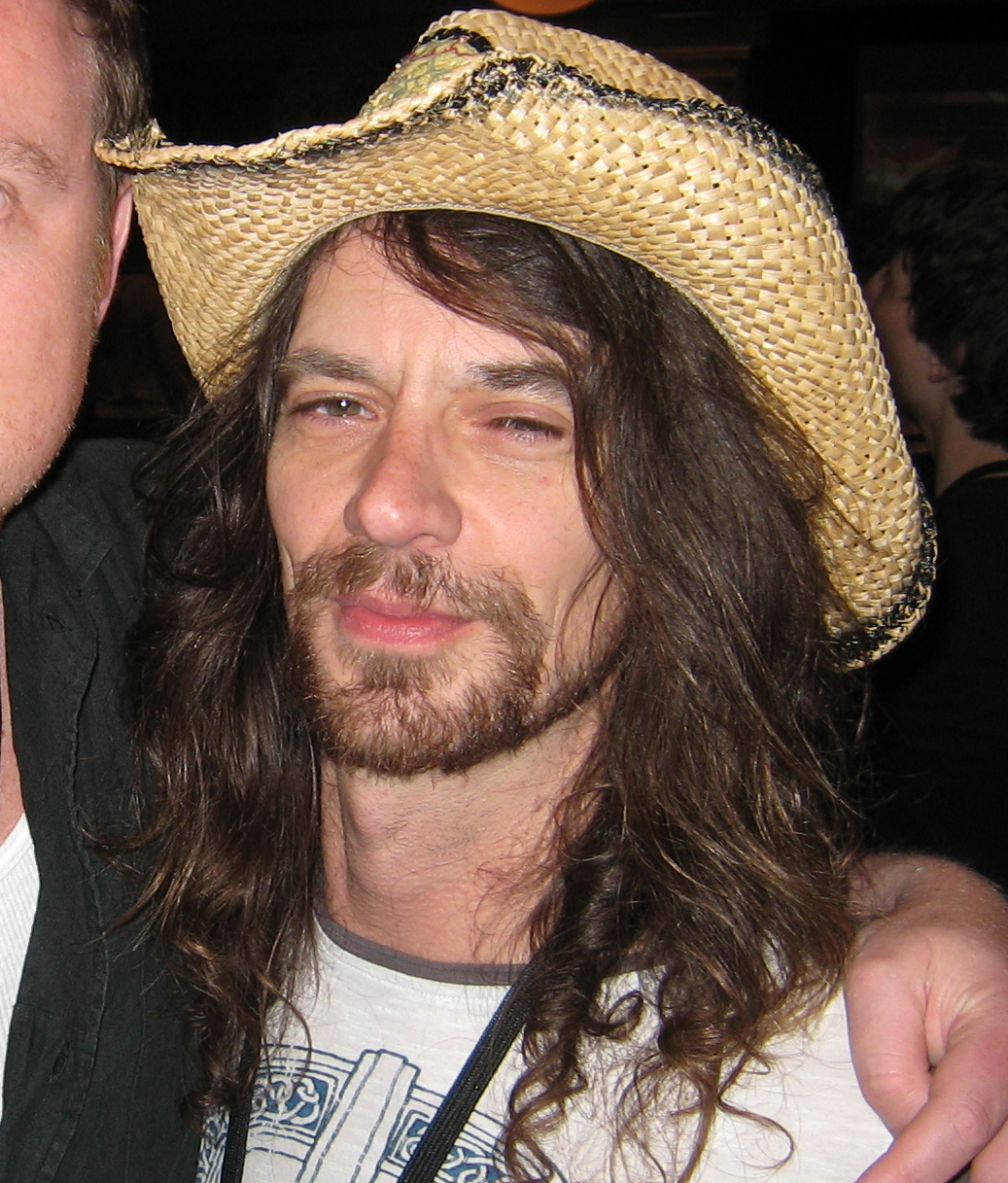
Jeff Williams

The music for the first eight volumes of RWBY has been composed primarily by Jeff Williams, with additional composition by Steve Goldshein, Mason Lieberman and Alex Abraham. Williams was a member of the band Trocadero, who did the music for Rooster Teeth's Red vs. Blue, and eventually composed by himself the music for the three seasons of Red vs. Blue that preceded RWBY. Most of the vocals are provided by Williams' daughter Casey Lee Williams, with some additional vocals by Lamar Hall, Sandy Casey, Adrienne Cowan, Williams himself, and others.

The soundtrack features a variety of genres, most notably intense, fast-paced rock music. In an interview with Rooster Teeth, Williams mentioned that he uses his lyrics to foreshadow future events on occasion. In developing the songs, Williams uses the show's script and picks out random words and phrases that he thinks are cool. He would also get advanced knowledge as to the character's development, their background stories and lives. He then picks out the emotions related to the scene, adds tempo, drumbeats, rhythm and eventually composes the song from there.

In December 2022, Williams announced his retirement from music composition, with his daughter Casey taking over as the lead composer for RWBY starting with Volume 9. She is joined by Martin De Lima and Martin Gonzales, her fellow Ok Goodnight band members.

== Spin-offs ==
=== RWBY: World of Remnant (2014–17) ===
RWBY: World of Remnant is a series of animated shorts that comprises 16 episodes across three seasons. Each season aired concurrently with volumes 2–4, with each episode providing expository information on various subjects within the world of Remnant. The first season, which was narrated by Jen Taylor (who voices the character Salem on RWBY), premiered on Rooster Teeth on August 21, 2014, and concluded on November 14, 2014. The second season, which was narrated by Shannon McCormick (who voices the character Ozpin on RWBY), premiered on October 8, 2015, and concluded on January 23, 2016. The third season, which was narrated by Vic Mignogna (who voices the character Qrow Branwen on RWBY for volumes 3–6), premiered on October 17, 2016, and concluded on January 14, 2017.

=== RWBY Chibi (2016–18) ===
RWBY Chibi is a series of comedic animated shorts that comprises 64 episodes across three seasons. It was first announced as part of Rooster Teeth's 13th-anniversary celebration on April 1, 2016. Each episode consists of several individual segments where aspects of characters from RWBY are usually exaggerated for comic effect. The episodes follow no strict chronological order, nor do they follow the strict canon of the main series. The first season premiered on Rooster Teeth on May 7, 2016, and concluded on October 15, 2016. The second season premiered on May 13, 2017, and concluded on December 14, 2017. The third season premiered on January 27, 2018, and concluded on August 18, 2018. Following the conclusion of the third season, the series was put on an indefinite hiatus.

Ten additional RWBY Chibi segments were later produced as part of Rooster Teeth's animated anthology series, Neon Konbini, which premiered on May 27, 2021, and concluded on July 15, 2021.

=== RWBY: Fairy Tales (2021) ===
RWBY: Fairy Tales is an anthology series of animated shorts that adapts several stories from the book RWBY: Fairy Tales of Remnant. The series premiered on October 30, 2021, for Rooster Teeth FIRST members and the following day for the public and concluded on December 4, 2021, after six episodes.

=== RWBY: Ice Queendom (2022) ===
RWBY: Ice Queendom (RWBY 氷雪帝国, Rubī: Hyōsetsu Teikoku) is an anime television series that was announced on March 25, 2022. The Japanese-language version of the anime series premiered on July 3, 2022, on Tokyo MX, BS11 and MBS and concluded on September 18, 2022, after twelve episodes. The English-language version premiered on Rooster Teeth on September 25, 2022, and concluded on December 11, 2022. The series is produced by Shaft and directed by Toshimasa Suzuki, with Kenjirō Okada in charge of chief direction, Gen Urobuchi in charge of animation concept, and Tow Ubukata in charge of script; in addition, Huke designed the character concepts, and Nobuhiro Sugiyama designed the characters for animation. Nobuko Toda and Kazuma Jinnouchi are composing the music. The cast for the Japanese dub of the original series reprised their respective roles. Void_Chords feat. L performed the opening theme song "Beyond Selves", while Ruby's Japanese voice actress, Saori Hayami, performed the ending theme song "Awake". Both the English- and Japanese-language (with English subtitles) versions of the series were also released on Crunchyroll.

=== Justice League x RWBY: Super Heroes & Huntsmen (2023) ===
Justice League x RWBY: Super Heroes & Huntsmen is a two-part direct-to-video film that was announced on July 1, 2022, at RTX, and was produced by Rooster Teeth in collaboration with Warner Bros. Animation and Warner Bros. Home Entertainment. It acts as a crossover with characters from DC Comics and is loosely based on the RWBY x Justice League and DC/RWBY comic book series. It features the four main protagonists of RWBY (Ruby Rose, Weiss Schnee, Blake Belladonna and Yang Xiao Long), along with several other RWBY characters, most notably Jaune Arc, Nora Valkyrie and Lie Ren. Also featured are characters based on the DC Comics superheroes Superman, Batman, Wonder Woman, the Flash, Green Lantern, Cyborg, Vixen and Black Canary.

Part One first premiered at WonderCon on March 25, 2023 before being released on April 25, 2023, on Prime Video, Apple TV+ and Google Play among other digital platforms. It was later added to Max on July 24, 2023.

Part Two was released on October 17, 2023 and was later added to Max on January 29, 2024. The Complete Adventure, which combines both parts into a single film, was released on December 5, 2023.

=== RWBY Beyond (2024) ===
RWBY Beyond (also known as RWBY Volume 9: Beyond) is an anthology series of animated shorts that focuses on events that occur on Remnant during and after Volume 9. The series premiered on April 13, 2024, and concluded on April 27, 2024, after four episodes.

== Reception ==
=== Critical response ===
RWBY received mostly positive reviews from critics around its debut. Commentators discussing the promotional trailers lauded the show's animation style and soundtrack. The trailers prompted enthusiastic anticipation for the series premiere. When the first episode premiered at RTX, all three screenings had seats sold out. Amanda Rush, writing for Crunchyroll, noted the anime and Western influences of the series, and praised it as "quick-witted, exciting, lovely to look at" saying fans of anime would enjoy it. The Yakima Herald-Republic called it "thrilling" and "captivating" and praised its "beautiful" 3D character animation. The Austin Chronicle described the premiere as making Oum the "rock star" of Rooster Teeth. By mid-2013, the series had reportedly contributed to a 9% increase in views for Rooster Teeth's official YouTube channel. Kotaku's Richard Eisenbeis praised the series for its use of fairytale elements, fun and enjoyable dialogue, and the fighting choreography, but was critical about the short nature of the episodes, stating that, "The biggest drawback in doing a micro-series ... is that there is precious little time for good characterization". He was also critical of the technical issues of the animation, mentioning that the animation is good when the audience is unable to see the character's feet. He believes that RWBY is "a good first step into a world of possibilities." Similarly, Rose Bridges of Autostraddle called the first volume "kind of a mess," criticizing its "technical failings," and having the female characters fall into existing stereotypes, while hoping that the second volume would address some of these issues. In contrast, Diane Darcy of CBR said that RWBY had been "challenging bisexual stereotypes for a full decade" through the protagonists of Blake Belladonna and Yang Xiao Long, with Blake dating men and women, and Yang's attraction to men and women, while noting Blake's camaraderie, and later love, of Yang.

Rachel Sandell of Collider recommended watching each season as a feature-length film, and argued the pacing the series has "always been a strange experience". She also said the pacing of early seasons "seems strange" and argued that the series took a "long time" to solidify its plot, but stated that more recent episodes are "more consistent" in their structure, and said the series is "engrossing, charming, and fun". Ruth Johnson of ComicsBeat argued that the series has expanded so much over its run since Season 1 that it can be "hard to keep track of all the storylines", but praised the voice acting, animation and writers, and said that show is "consistently...growing stronger." Eric Francisco of Inverse described the series as "beautiful" and "captivating". Anime News Network reviewer Michael Basile reflected on the series eight volumes, concluding that the plot structure, writing and pacing has changed since the beginning of the series, praising the writing of General Ironwood and the show's seventh volume, but criticizing the writing, "lack of creativity" in fight scenes, the show's tone, and called Volume 8 "nasty and mean-spirited". He also expressed the belief that the show's ninth volume would give the series a "directional reset" and said that he hoped the writing would improve.

The ninth volume of RWBY, which aired in 2023, was praised by critics for its story, characters, animation style, pacing, and music but criticized for muddling some aspects or "missing the mark" in other ways. Some critics praised the episode "Confessions Within Cumulonimbus Clouds," where Blake and Yang confessed to one another, and kiss, noting Blake's emotional support for Yang, with Blake creating "a safe space for Yang to be vulnerable."

=== Associations with anime ===
"As huge fans of anime, we are honored that RWBY is the first American anime production to be exported to audiences in Japan."

— Rooster Teeth CEO Matt Hullum

Lindsay Jones (Ruby Rose) said "We were worried about the reception we'd get, since we're a western company producing something normally related to Japan. Funnily enough, we showed our Japanese cohorts RWBY and they started arguing about whether it was anime or not! But seeing the reception from audiences is so surreal, and we never expected it." A Movie Pilot blog listed the RWBY-as-anime topic among its "flame wars you don't want to be part of". Anime News Network writers Paul Jensen and James Beckett wrote: "We don't have any formal reviews of RWBY here on ANN, but it is kind of cool to see an American production make it to the release encyclopedia." Michael Mauer of The Cornell Daily Sun wrote that the issue was still being debated among the anime community, while Sabrina Pyun of ComicsVerse wrote "The show is known for many things, from its dubious status as an anime to its unique 3D animation style." However, mainstream news articles dated after Hullum's statement and previewing later seasons and the franchise have referred to RWBY as an American anime, including Variety, Collider, iDigitalTimes, Entertainment Weekly, Adweek, and Deadline Hollywood.

=== Awards and nominations ===
Year	Association	Category	Nominee	Result
2014	International Academy of Web Television	Best Animated Series	RWBY	Won
2014	4th Streamy Awards	Best Animated Series	RWBY	Won
2014	4th Streamy Awards	Best Original Score	Jeff Williams	Won
2015	5th Streamy Awards	Best Animated Series	RWBY	Nominated
2016	6th Streamy Awards	Best Animated Series	RWBY	Nominated
2017	7th Streamy Awards	Best Animated Series	RWBY	Won

== Other media ==
=== Books ===
- RWBY: After the Fall (2019) is a novel written by E. C. Myers and published by Scholastic on June 25, 2019. It details the adventures of Team CFVY ("coffee") following the events of the Volume 3 finale, as the team travels to Shade Academy in Vacuo to continue their training and deals with the personal and global aftermath of the Fall of Beacon.
- The World of RWBY: The Official Companion (2019) is an art book written by Daniel Wallace and published by Viz Media on October 29, 2019. It features behind-the-scenes information, interviews and concept art from the show.
- RWBY: Before the Dawn (2020) is a novel that acts as a direct sequel to After the Fall. It was written by E. C. Myers and published by Scholastic on July 21, 2020. The book takes place after the start of Volume 6 and follows Team CFVY and Team SSSN ("sun") as they investigate a mysterious organization in Vacuo known as The Crown.
- RWBY: Fairy Tales of Remnant (2020) is a book featuring original fairy tales created for the fictional world of Remnant. It was written by E. C. Myers, illustrated by Violet Tobacco, and published by Scholastic on September 15, 2020.
- RWBY: Roman Holiday (2021) is a novel written by E.C. Myers and published by Scholastic on September 7, 2021. It acts as a prequel to RWBY and centers on the characters Roman Torchwick and Neopolitan.

=== Comics ===
- RWBY (2019–20) was first revealed at New York Comic Con in 2018 after Rooster Teeth announced a partnership with DC Comics to publish RWBY and Gen:Lock comics. It is written by Marguerite Bennett and illustrated by Mirka Andolfo and Arif Prianto. The comic series is set between the events of Volumes 3 and 4 of the RWBY web series and the first issue was released on August 28, 2019. The print issue #7, the final issue, was cancelled, but would later be included in the trade paperback release of the RWBY comic later on August 11, 2020.
- RWBY x Justice League (2021) was first revealed by DC Comics in April 2021 as a crossover comic series between RWBY and the Justice League. The first issue was released digitally on March 30, 2021, followed by the first print issue on April 27, 2021. The seventh and final issue was released digitally on June 22, 2021, followed by the final print issue on October 26, 2021.
- DC/RWBY (2023) is a second crossover comic series with DC Comics and is set in a separate continuity to RWBY x Justice League. The first issue was released digitally on February 28, 2023, with the seventh and final issue being released on August 22, 2023.

=== Manga ===
- RWBY
- Cover of the first volume of the RWBY manga adaptation by Shirow Miwa
- Genre: Adventure, science fantasy
- Manga
- Written by: Shirow Miwa
- Published by: Shueisha
- English publisher: Viz Media
- Magazine: Ultra Jump
- English magazine: Weekly Shonen Jump
- Original run: November 19, 2015 – February 18, 2017
- Volumes: 1
- Manga

RWBY: Official Manga Anthology
- Written by: Home-sha
- Published by: Home-sha
- English publisher: Viz Media
- Original run: May 19, 2017 – July 20, 2021
- Volumes: 5
- Manga

RWBY: The Official Manga
- Written by: Bunta Kinami
- Published by: Shueisha
- English publisher: Viz Media
- Magazine: Shōnen Jump+
- English magazine: Weekly Shonen Jump
- Original run: November 19, 2018 – June 25, 2020
- Volumes: 3
- icon

- RWBY (2015–17) is a manga adaption of the web series of the same name that was written and illustrated by Shirow Miwa. It was published in Shueisha's monthly seinen magazine Ultra Jump. The first arc of the manga closely followed the storyline of the four trailers of the main series, while subsequent chapters explored original storylines. The first chapter was released in the Ultra Jump December issue, on November 19, 2015. It had colored center and back pages, along with additional art from the manga. The English translation was published in Viz Media's Weekly Shonen Jump manga anthology and released for audiences worldwide on October 31, 2016.
  Like the web series, the RWBY manga follows the members of Team RWBY—Ruby Rose, Weiss Schnee, Blake Belladonna and Yang Xiao Long—and their adventures as they train to become Huntresses at a prestigious school known as Beacon Academy. The manga delves into the backstories and motivations of the four main characters, giving new insights and context, with appearances from many of the other characters in the main series. The manga also explains some concepts and elements of the setting, such as the Grimm and Dust. The remaining six chapters cover an original story chronologically set between Volumes 1 and 2 involving teams RWBY and JNPR fighting King Taijitu merged by a Grimm that was accidentally let loose as Torchwick investigated a possible entrance to Mountain Glenn. The final chapter was published in the February 2017 issue of Ultra Jump and included a teaser about a second volume.
- RWBY: Official Manga Anthology (2017–21) is a manga adaption of RWBY that consists of side stories that follow the plot of the show, put together by multiple manga artists. It was released in a multi-volume format. On December 23, 2016, Japanese entertainment company Home-sha announced Vol. 1: Red Like Roses, the first volume of RWBY: Official Manga Anthology and stated it was coming in Spring 2017. It was later announced on March 25, 2017, that it would be released on May 19, 2017, in Japan and was later released on May 15, 2018, in the US.
  The second volume, Vol. 2: Mirror Mirror, was released on June 19, 2017, in Japan and August 21, 2018, in the US. The third volume, Vol. 3: From Shadows, was released on September 19, 2017, in Japan and November 20, 2018, in the US. The fourth volume, Vol. 4: I Burn, was released on October 19, 2017, in Japan and February 19, 2019, in the US. The fifth volume, Vol. 5: Shine was released on July 20, 2021, in the US. In North America, Viz Media licensed the manga for an English-language release.
- RWBY: The Official Manga (2018–20) is a manga adaptation of RWBY written by manga artist Bunta Kinami. It was first published in the Weekly Shonen Jump magazine on November 19, 2018, and in Shōnen Jump+ on December 20, 2018. Shueisha published the first tankōbon volume digitally on August 19, 2019. The manga finished on June 25, 2020.
- RWBY: Ice Queendom (2022–23) is a manga adaptation of the anime series of the same name that was written and illustrated by Kumiko Suekane. It was first published in the ASCII Media Works's shōnen manga magazine Dengeki Daioh on June 27, 2022 and finished on November 27, 2023.

=== Video games ===
- RWBY: Grimm Eclipse (2016) is a hack and slash game developed and published by Rooster Teeth Games. It was released on July 5, 2016, for Windows via the Steam platform, and was later released for PlayStation 4 and Xbox One on January 17, 2017. A definitive version of the game, including all downloadable content, was released for Nintendo Switch on May 13, 2021.
- RWBY: Amity Arena (2018) was a tower defense game developed by NHN Entertainment and BaobabNet, and published by Rooster Teeth Games. It was released for Android and iOS devices on October 25, 2018, and was later discontinued on January 28, 2021.
- RWBY Deckbuilding Game (2019) was a collectable card game developed by 80Arcade and published by Rooster Teeth Games. It was released for Android and iOS devices on February 14, 2019, and was later discontinued on April 30, 2020.
- RWBY: Crystal Match (2019) was a puzzle game developed by EGLS Technology and Crunchyroll Games, and published by Rooster Teeth Games. It was released for Android and iOS devices on August 12, 2019, and was later discontinued on June 2, 2021.
- RWBY: Arrowfell (2022) is a sidescrolling action-adventure game developed by WayForward and Arc System Works, and published by Rooster Teeth Games. It was released for Nintendo Switch, PlayStation 4, PlayStation 5, Xbox One, Xbox Series X/S, and Windows via Steam on November 15, 2022.

=== Miscellaneous ===
- RWBY Rewind (2017–19) is an aftershow for RWBY that was released concurrently with the fifth and sixth volumes and features the cast and crew discussing key scenes from each episode.
- CRWBY: Behind the Episode (2017–19) is a series of behind-the-scenes shorts about the production of the fifth and sixth volumes and features interviews with the cast and crew.
- Talk CRWBY to Me (2020–22) is a behind-the-scenes podcast hosted by Kerry Shawcross that discusses the production of RWBY with the cast and crew from different departments within Rooster Teeth Animation. The podcast is exclusive for Rooster Teeth FIRST members and was released during the hiatus between the seventh and eighth volumes. It was first released on May 23, 2020, and concluded on July 11, 2020. A special episode was later released on June 30, 2022, discussing the production of RWBY: Ice Queendom.
- RWBY: The Grimm Campaign (2020–24) is a Dungeons & Dragons campaign set in the world of Remnant. The cast includes Kerry Shawcross as Pyke Rite, Laura Yates as Arrastra Skye, Chad James as Asher Mora, Chris Kokkinos as Fenix Nemean and Eddy Rivas as the Dungeon Master. The series is exclusive for Rooster Teeth FIRST members. The first season premiered on August 15, 2020, and concluded on October 10, 2020. The second season premiered on February 15, 2021, and concluded on May 24, 2021. The campaign features an early version of the digital tabletop software TaleSpire with custom models based on RWBY. A special episode with a self-contained story that featured the return of Shawcross, Yates, James and Rivas with Lindsay Jones joining them as a special guest, was streamed live on April 17, 2024.
- RWBY Roundtable (2023) is an aftershow for RWBY that was released concurrently with the ninth volume and features the cast and crew discussing key scenes from each episode.

=== Appearances in other media ===
- At Evo 2017, it was announced that the fighting game BlazBlue: Cross Tag Battle would feature crossover characters from BlazBlue, Persona 4 Arena (Ultimax), Under Night In-Birth and RWBY, followed by Arcana Heart, Senran Kagura and Akatsuki Blitzkampf as of 2019. Ruby Rose was a featured participant in the game's first teaser trailer, and Weiss Schnee was confirmed in the second character introduction trailer. Blake Belladonna and Yang Xiao Long were later added to the game as free downloadable content. At Evo 2019, it was announced that Neopolitan (incorrectly referred to as Neo Politan in-game) would be added to the game as part of a 2.0 update that was released on November 21, 2019.
- In the film Doctor Sleep (2019), the character Abra Stone has RWBY posters and a statue of the character Emerald Sustrai in her room, and also wears Emerald's hair in a dream sequence. The filmmakers decided to bring in the references suggested by Abra's portrayer Kyliegh Curran, who is a fan of RWBY.
- Characters from RWBY have been featured in limited-time crossovers with several video games as either unlockable characters or skins. These include: Crusader's Quest in both May 2017 and August 2022, Puzzle of Empires in October 2017, Knights Chronicle in July 2019, SMITE in both November 2019 and October 2022, Paladins in June 2022 and Black Rock Shooter FRAGMENT in April 2023.
- All four of the main protagonists have been featured in the battleboarding web series Death Battle, which was produced by Rooster Teeth from 2019 to 2024. All of the voice actresses reprise their roles for the show. Prior to Rooster Teeth's acquisition, Yang appeared in the second season, where she fought Tifa Lockhart from Final Fantasy VII. During Rooster Teeth's production, Weiss fought Mitsuru Kirijo from Persona 3 and Blake fought Mikasa Ackerman from Attack on Titan. After the show became independent, Ruby fought Maka Albarn from Soul Eater in the 2025 season.
