= Gray Haddock =

American actor and producer

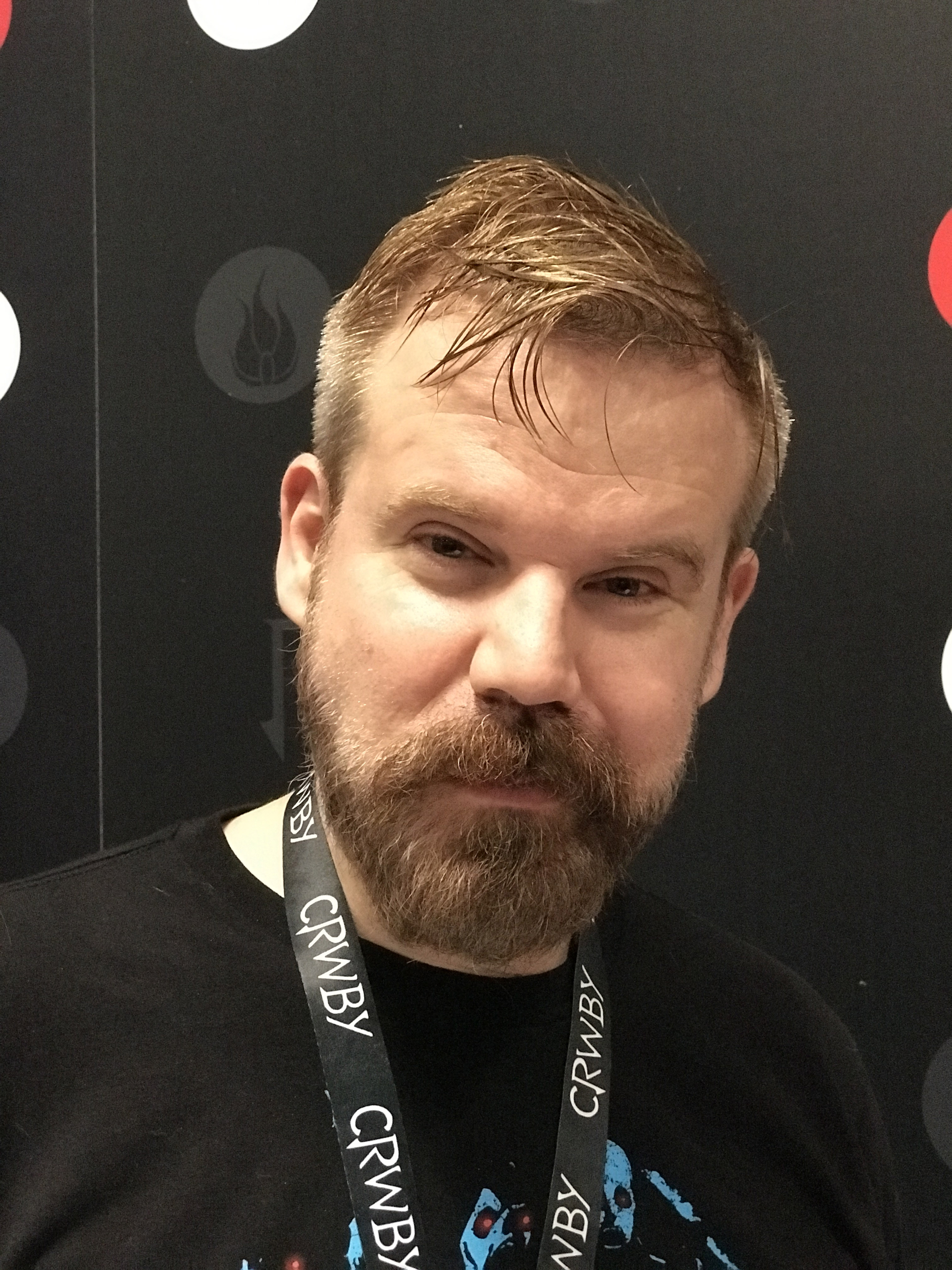
- Haddock at the 2017 New York Comic Con
- Education: University of Texas at Austin
- Occupations: Voice actor, film producer
- Years active: 1995–2019
- Employer: Rooster Teeth (2011–2019)
- Spouse: Lara Toner
- Children: 2

Gray G. Haddock is an American actor and film producer. He is the former head of animation at Rooster Teeth, a production studio in Austin, Texas, where he created the 2019 mecha web series Gen:Lock. He is known for voice roles such as Locus and Roman Torchwick in the Rooster Teeth productions Red vs. Blue and RWBY, respectively, as well as Sanosuke Sagara in the English dub of Rurouni Kenshin, Oreldo in Pumpkin Scissors, and Yousuke Fuuma from Wedding Peach.

== Career ==
Gray Haddock graduated from the University of Texas at Austin in 1996.

Haddock received his first voice acting credit in 1995. He acted for many years, primarily as a voice actor in English dubbed versions of Japanese anime. In 1997, he was cast as Sanosuke Sagara in the film Rurouni Kenshin: Requiem for the Ishin Patriots, a role which he reprised in the 2001 film Rurouni Kenshin: Reflection and the Rurouni Kenshin: New Kyoto Arc two-film series in 2011 and 2012. In 1998, he played the role of Lei Wulong in Tekken: The Motion Picture.

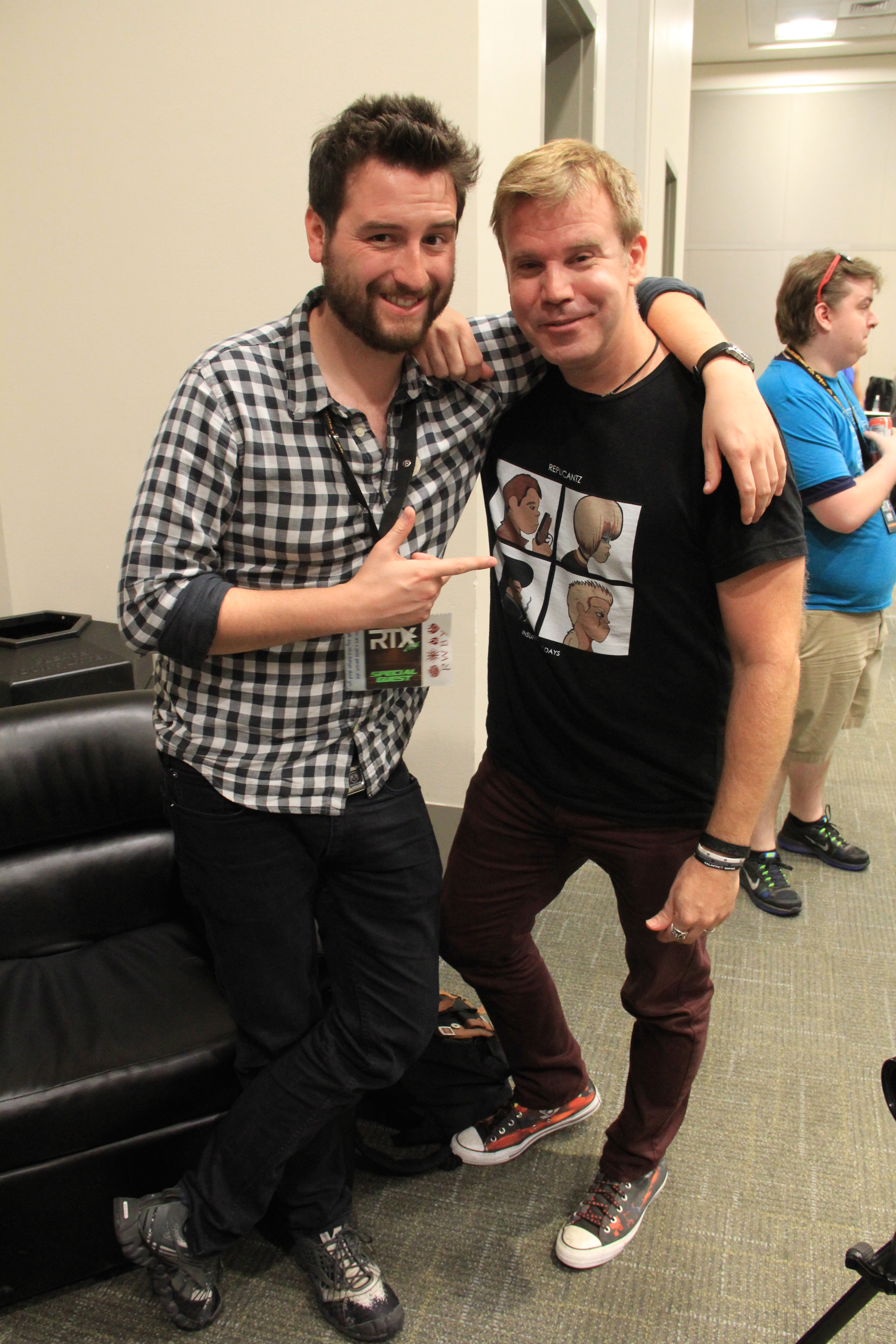
Miles Luna, a former Rooster Teeth writer and voice actor, with Haddock at RTX 2015

In August 2011, Haddock was hired by Rooster Teeth as a visual effects artist and digital compositor working on season 9 of Red vs. Blue. He then worked on season 10 of Red vs. Blue and, in 2013, he took on a voice acting position as Roman Torchwick in Rooster Teeth's animated series, RWBY. He also took on the role of Locus in Red vs. Blue, a character that debuted in Season 11.

In 2014, Haddock co-starred in the two-hander play Venus in Fur, opposite Molly Karrasch and directed by his wife Lara Toner.

In 2014, Haddock worked as a producer on the second season of RWBY. In September 2014, he became head of the newly-formed Rooster Teeth Animation department. When production started on its third season in 2015, Haddock became a co-director and producer for RWBY. In 2018, he became writer and director for a mecha series on Rooster Teeth, Gen:Lock. In June 2019, following complaints from his former employees regarding negative working conditions, Haddock stepped down as the head of RT Animation to fulfill a strictly creative role. In September 2019, he announced he had left Rooster Teeth.

== Filmography ==
=== Voice acting ===
Year	Title	Role	Notes
1995	Wedding Peach	Yousuke Fuuma	TV series
1995	Legend of Crystania	Captain Chivalry, Grib	Film
1996	Tattoon Master	Hydra	TV series
1996	Reborn from Hell II: Jubei's Revenge	Jubei Yagyu	Film
1997	Sakura Diaries	Mashtu Tatsuhiko	TV series
1997	Rurouni Kenshin: Requiem for the Ishin Patriots	Sanosuke Sagara	Film
1997–1998	Ninja Resurrection	Jubei Yagyu	TV mini-series, 2 episodes
1998	Lost Universe	Rando	TV series
1998	Tekken: The Motion Picture	Lei Wulong	Film
1998–1999	Steam Detectives	Le Bled	TV series, 6 episodes
1999	Hoshin Engi	Hakuyuko	TV series
2001	Z.O.E. Dolores, I	Basilico Basilisk	TV series, episode: "James no sainan"
2001	Rurouni Kenshin: Reflection	Sanosuke Sagara	TV mini-series, 2 episodes
2001	Conquest: Frontier Wars	Turbine Doc, Blanus, Battleship	Video game
2002	Jing: King of Bandits	Postino	TV mini-series
2003	Kidô shinsengumi: Moe yo ken	Ukon Tanaka	Film
2003	Deus Ex: Invisible War	SSC Guard #2, Announcer #1	Video game
2003–2004	Wedding Peach	Yousuke Fuuma/Viento	TV series
2004	Ou Dorobou Jing in Seventh Heaven	Postino	Short film
2004	Thief: Deadly Shadows	Townspeople #3	Video game
2005–2006	Guyver: The Bioboosted Armor	Archanfel	TV series, 6 episodes
2006	009-1	Loki	TV series, 4 episodes
2006–2010	Pumpkin Scissors	Oreldo	TV series, 24 episodes
2007	Metroid Prime 3: Corruption	Various soldiers	Video game
2011	DC Universe Online	Green Lantern, Black Hand, S.T.A.R. Labs Scientist	Video game
2011–2012	Rurouni Kenshin: New Kyoto Arc	Sanosuke Sagara	Film series, 2 films
2012–2019	Red vs. Blue	Locus, Donald Doyle, Resistance Soldier	Web series
2013–2016	RWBY	Roman Torchwick	Web series
2014–2015	X-Ray and Vav	Rusty Bonjour	Web series, 5 episodes
2016	My Hero Academia	Electric Villain (additional voices)	Anime, 1 episode
2016	Luck and Logic	Rentaro Tsurugi	Anime
2016–2018	RWBY Chibi	Roman Torchwick	Web series, 5 episodes
2019	Gen:Lock	Leon August	Web series
2020	Transformers: War for Cybertron Trilogy	Spinister	Animated series

=== Live action ===
Year	Title	Role	Notes
2016–2018	Fan Service	Himself	Podcast, 49 episodes
2017	Million Dollars, But...	Himself	Web series, episode: "Theme Pack: Animation"

=== Production ===
Year	Title	Role	Notes
2011	My Sucky Teen Romance	Visual effects	Film
2011	Jeff, Who Lives at Home	Visual effects	Film
2011–2018	Red vs. Blue	Visual effects (until 2012); Supervising producer (since 2014)	Web series
2013–2018	RWBY	Editor, producer (since 2014), co-director (2015 to 2018)	Web series
2014–2015	X-Ray and Vav	Producer (5 episodes)	Web series
2016–2019	RWBY Chibi	Supervising producer (6 episodes)	Web series
2016–2019	Camp Camp	Producer (5 episodes), writer (2 episodes)	Web series
2019	Gen:Lock	Writer, director	Web series
