= RWBY: Arrowfell =

2022 video game

- Developers: WayForward; Arc System Works
- Publishers: Rooster Teeth Games; WayForward
- Platforms: Nintendo Switch; PlayStation 4; PlayStation 5; Xbox One; Xbox Series X/S; Windows; Android; iOS
- Release: WW: November 15, 2022; Mobile: WW: August 26, 2024
- Genre: Action-adventure
- Mode: Single-player

RWBY: Arrowfell is a 2022 action-adventure game developed by WayForward and Arc System Works and published by Rooster Teeth Games, as part of the RWBY franchise. It was released for Nintendo Switch, PlayStation 4, PlayStation 5, Xbox One, Xbox Series X/S, and Windows on November 15, 2022. A mobile version of the game was released for Android and iOS, via Crunchyroll Game Vault, on August 26, 2024.

The game was written by RWBY series writers, Kerry Shawcross, Miles Luna, and Eddy Rivas, and features animated cutscenes in the style of the RWBY series with the returning voice talents of the RWBY series cast. It also features an original vocal track by Casey Lee Williams.

The game's events are canonical to RWBY, and are set during Volume 7 of the RWBY series. It depicts Team RWBY's first proper mission as officially licensed huntresses, within the setting of Solitas, and introduces a new team, Team BRIR. The critical reception to the game was mixed.

== Plot ==
After becoming licensed Huntresses, Team RWBY investigates a surge in Grimm near Mantle and destroys an orb drawing the creatures in. Pietro Polendina identifies the remains as technology from Fort Arrowfell, a decommissioned Atlas base. In the settlement of Essen, guardian Russet Ka asks them to recover ore for new armor after Grimm nearly overran the village, as they had the ruins of Crossed. Once the armor is delivered, a Megoliath nearly kills the team before four Huntresses—Bianca Prisma, Roane Ashwood, Ivy Thickety, and Ruda Tilleroot—intervene. Bram Thornmane arrives and orders them away and identifies them as Team BRIR, mercenaries who protect villages only for pay. A rejected candidate for the Ace Operatives, he confiscates the orb and sends the team to Lieutenant Colonel Olive Harper.

Harper has Team RWBY assist the Ace Operatives while she traces the device. The work exposes a weapons-furnishing ring tied to Atlas crime boss Amoncio Glass. After Team RWBY destroys his mech, Glass admits the orbs are bait charged with extracted negative emotion and that he only distributed them for an anonymous client. Harper, Thornmane, and General James Ironwood suspect Mantle union leader Hanlon Fifestone, whose Semblance can pull emotions from others, and fear an attack on Amity Communications Tower. In Mantle the team tracks Fifestone to the industrial center, where he is draining fear from a Faunus worker into an orb and is revealed as the cause of recent Faunus disappearances. Arrested, he claims he once hoped to ease the Atlas–Mantle divide, then triggers a remote.

Hidden orbs activate and Grimm attacks spike across Solitas. Team RWBY destroys four of them before Harper and Ironwood report that the mastermind is north of Atlas. A military train meant to carry the team there turns on them; Ruby realizes Harper has set them up. After the crash, Team BRIR—calling themselves the Keepers of Arrowfell—attacks on Thornmane’s orders, having been told by him that Team RWBY stole the orbs.

Ironwood confirms Harper and Thornmane have retreated into Fort Arrowfell. Glass distributed the orbs and Fifestone was coerced into charging them; the real aim was never Amity but Ironwood’s reputation. Only the Keepers can open the fort. Penny Polendina unlocks the Crystal Nexus, the tunnel network Team BRIR uses, and its members—now aware they were used—hand over the keys. Inside, a remorseful Harper admits she joined Thornmane believing it might address the kingdom’s divide, supplied Glass with military technology, and will surrender. Thornmane fights with orb-summoned Grimm and confesses he hated Ironwood for denying him the Ace Operatives and the heroism he craved. After his defeat, Ironwood notes that the scheme has only exposed further corruption, and congratulates Team RWBY on their first true mission as Huntresses.

== Gameplay ==
RWBY: Arrowfell is a 2D side-scrolling action-adventure game designed as a "Metroidvania-lite". The core gameplay centers around real-time character swapping, platforming, environmental puzzle-solving, and stat customization. Players can instantly swap between all four members of Team RWBY at any point during gameplay.

Every character possesses a standard melee combo using their signature weapon, alongside a slower-regenerating ranged projectile attack. Rather than having separate life bars, the entire team shares a single pool of health, represented by hearts. They also share a green energy (aura) bar, which functions as a shield/health bar and is consumed when firing ranged attacks, as well as when taking damage. When this bar is depleted, taking any additional damage will remove a heart, and the player gets a game over if they lose all their hearts. The energy bar remains depleted after losing a heart, so it is possible to lose multiple hearts in succession, although there is a brief invincibility period after losing a heart. Energy regenerates naturally over time (the speed of which can be upgraded with skill points), and the player can also collect refills as items in stages, as well as finding hearts to cover lost health.

Each huntress has a distinct ability tied to their Semblance. These powers are used to defeat specific enemy types, navigate environments, and solve puzzle rooms. Arrowfell utilises a non-linear World Map layout. Players select individual, self-contained stages from the map screen. Progress requires backtracking to older levels once new narrative quest items are secured or when character Semblances receive automated story upgrades (such as Weiss gaining the ability to spawn a second platform). In-game items such as additional hearts of health, or healing items, cost currency (lien). Additionally, Skill Points can be acquired across levels from chests. These points can be used to upgrade each member of Team RWBY in four areas: Melee attack, long-range attack, energy regeneration, and defense.

== Reception ==
RWBY: Arrowfell received "mixed or average" critical reception, according to Metacritic. It scored 57% with a 19% critic recommendation, according to OpenCritic. Overall, the game rarely scored above 60/100 in critical reviews, and the general, average opinion was that the game, while broadly enjoyable, was either mediocre compared to more worthy titles in the same genre, or other games in WayForward's library, or was missing vital quality of life components.

As an video game representation of RWBY, critical opinion that the game was best experienced by RWBY fans was generally consistent, although both the level of accessibility for non-RWBY fans, as well as the quality of entertainment for RWBY fans, was heavily mixed. Some critics felt that the game was far more enjoyable for RWBY fans, others felt it was generally accessible across the board, while others felt that, while some fans would enjoy the pure novelty of playing as Team RWBY, the game does not provide fans with enough to do the show justice. Some critics who had not seen RWBY before playing the game felt the game did a poor job at interesting them in the show, while others considered the game's characters and story components "adorable", "cute", and "badass", and a fun introduction to the show. Other critics felt as though the game "can’t seem to decide if it wants to be for the core fans or for the newcomers", with a story that was seemingly made "generic" for newcomers, despite remaining "unfriendly" for anyone unfamiliar with RWBY lore.

Critical opinion on the gameplay and other game components was equally mixed. Praise was generally given to the characters, the character banter, character designs and portraits, animated cutscenes, and soundtrack. Criticism was given to the small amount of voice acting, the lack of side content or reason for exploration, the repetitive nature of combat, the poor character progression system. However, other critics enjoyed the character swapping mechanics, and the character upgrade systems. Some reviewers criticised the game's under-utilisation of character specific Semblance abilities and the lack of a need to utilise character swapping during gameplay, as well as the fact that the long-ranged attacks share ammo with the shield-health bar, disincentivising the use of long-ranged attack.

=== Legacy ===
As of Vol. 9, RWBY: Arrowfell's story and lore has not been acknowledged within the show. After the release of Arrowfell, WayForward has acknowledged Team RWBY as representative "heroines" of their company's portfolio. The game was ported to mobile and iOS under the title "Crunchrolly RWBY: Arrowfell" on August 26, 2024, exclusively via Crunchyroll Game Vault.
