= Monty Oum =

American animator and voice actor (1981–2015)

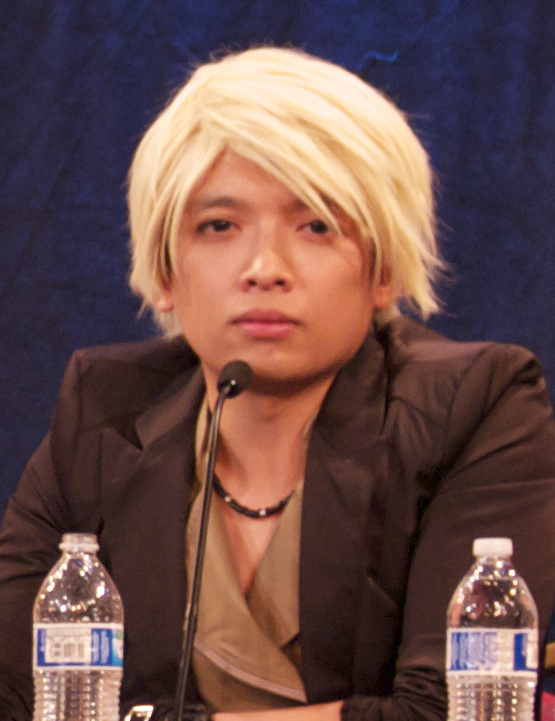
- Oum at PAX 2013
- Born: Monyreak Oum; June 22, 1981; Providence, Rhode Island, U.S.
- Died: February 1, 2015 (aged 33); Austin, Texas, U.S.
- Occupations: Animator, screenwriter, animation director, voice actor
- Years active: 2002–2015
- Employer: Rooster Teeth Productions
- Notable work: RWBY; Red vs. Blue; Haloid; Dead Fantasy
- Spouse: Sheena Duquette (m. 2014)
- Parents: Mony Oum; Vanna Oum

Monyreak "Monty" Oum (/oʊm/ OHM; June 22, 1981 – February 1, 2015) was an American web-based animator and writer.

Oum attracted attention within the gaming community after releasing an animated video in 2007, titled Haloid, where characters from the Halo and Metroid video game franchises fight against each other, which went viral. In October of the same year, he released a follow-up, Dead Fantasy. Oum began working for Rooster Teeth, serving as the lead animator for Red vs. Blue, and creating the original animated series RWBY.

Oum had a severe iatrogenic allergic reaction and fell into a coma in January 2015. He died on February 1, 2015, in Austin, Texas.

== Early life ==
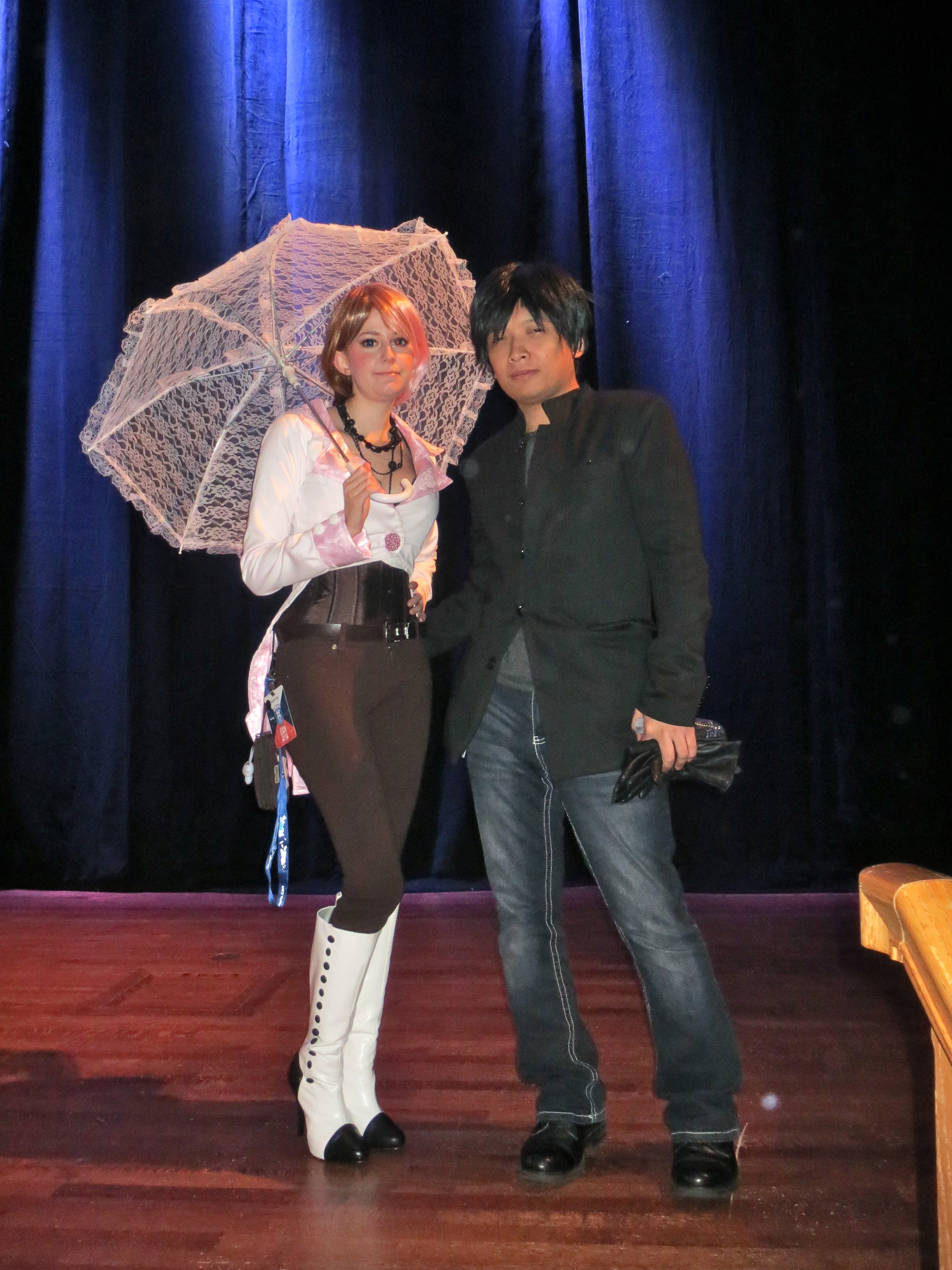
Oum and his wife Sheena Duquette (cosplaying as RWBY character Neo) at PAX West 2014

Oum was born in Providence, Rhode Island in 1981. He was of Cambodian, Vietnamese, Chinese, and Japanese heritage. He had four older brothers (including Neath, who took over voicing RWBY character Lie Ren after Oum's death) and two older sisters. As a teenager, he was a student at New Urban Arts, a community art studio for high school students in Providence.

== Career ==
=== Independent work ===
Oum dropped out of high school and began putting together gaming fan videos as early as 2002. In January 2007, he discovered some reverse engineering techniques online that allowed him to extract models from Halo 2 and, using assets from Super Smash Bros. Melee, created the "ultimate showdown" between a SPARTAN (Halo) and Samus Aran (Metroid) in Haloid, a portmanteau of their respective franchises. The videos garnered a significant number of views online. Later in 2007, Oum produced a series called "Dead Fantasy" in which characters from Final Fantasy and Dead or Alive fight.

=== Industry work ===
Two months after the premiere of Haloid, many gaming companies sought Oum, and he was eventually hired by Midway Games as a combat designer. In 2008 he was hired by Namco Bandai Games as a combat designer and animator for Afro Samurai. The brief experience in the gaming industry frustrated Oum, and in 2009, he met Rooster Teeth co-founder Burnie Burns at a panel during San Diego Comic-Con and the two discussed the possibility of Oum working for the company. It wasn't until PAX East 2010 that it was announced that Oum had been hired as an animator for the company's long-running web series Red vs. Blue.

His next work, the animated series RWBY, featured highly involved and fantastical combat sequences between super-powered characters that garnered a following online. RWBY was a commercial success for Rooster Teeth, and critical reviews highlighted the high quality of its animated fight scenes. Two seasons of the show were produced, with a third in production at the time of Oum's death in early 2015. The show has now run for nine seasons.

== Death ==
On January 22, 2015, Oum had an unspecified severe allergic reaction during a "simple medical procedure". On January 30, Rooster Teeth co-founder Burnie Burns stated that Oum was "in critical care and it is not known if he will recover". A donation page was set up for the medical expenses on GoFundMe, which received over $210,000. On February 1, 2015, at 4:34 p.m., Oum died as a result of anaphylaxis at the age of 33.

== Filmography ==
Year	Name	Director	Writer	Animator	Actor	Other	Notes
2007	Haloid	Yes	Yes	Yes		Yes	Producer, cinematographer, editor, visual effects
2007–09	Dead Fantasy	Yes	Yes	Yes		Yes	Creator
2009	Afro Samurai					Yes	Additional designer
2010–12	Red vs. Blue	Yes	Yes	Yes		Yes	Cinematographer
2010–14	Immersion				Yes		
2013	Internet Box Panel, RTX 2013				Yes	Yes	P. F. Chang's Deliveryman
2013–16	RWBY	Yes	Yes	Yes	Yes	Yes	Creator, voice of Ren (Volumes 1 and 2)

== Accolades ==
List of awards and nominations
Year	Award	Category	Title of work	Result
2014	Streamy Awards	Best Animated (Channel, Show or Series)	RWBY	Won
2014	International Academy of Web Television	Best Animated Series	RWBY	Won
2012	Producers Guild of America	Outstanding Digital Series	Red vs. Blue	Nominated
