= Deadliest Warrior season 1 =

Deadliest Warrior
- Season 1

Release
- Original release: April 7 – May 31, 2009

Season chronology
- Next → Season 2

Deadliest Warrior premiered on April 7, 2009 at 10 pm ET. Nine one-hour episodes of the show were produced for Season 1. Season 1 was released on DVD and Blu-ray on May 11, 2010.

== Episode 1: Apache vs. Gladiator ==
Apache team: Alan Tafoya (world champion knife fighter), Snake Blocker (U.S. Army combat instructor)
Apache weapons: Tomahawk, knife, bow and arrow, war club
Apache armor: Rawhide shield
Apache statistics: Height: 5 feet 7 inches, Weight: 140 pounds, Armor: None, Gear: 10 pounds

Gladiator team: Chris Torres (ancient weapons specialist), Steven Dietrich (gladiator combat instructor), Chuck Liddell (the Iceman)
Gladiator weapons: Cestus, scissor, trident & net, sling, sica
Gladiator armor: Murmillo helmet, leather shield Gladiator statistics: Height: 5 feet 8 inches, Weight: 185 pounds, Armor: Bronze, Gear: 10–38 pounds

Results
	Apache	Kills	Gladiator	Kills
Short-range weapons	Tomahawk	153	Cestus Scissor	25 25
Mid-range weapons	Knife	266	Trident & net	166
Long-range weapons	Bow & arrow	188	Sling	1
Special weapons	War club	60	Sica	116
Totals		667		333

- Though gladiators were class based and each had designated weapons, for this episode a generalized gladiator was used that combined weapons and armor of different classes. This was done so that the gladiator would be able to compete at different ranges, normally unnecessary in that they had one weapon combination (sword and shield, trident and net, etc.) and only fought other gladiators of opposite classes to optimize the entertainment.
- For short-range weapons, the tomahawk was tested against the cestus and the scissor. Snake Blocker tested two types of tomahawk on a gel head: one made of stone and one made of the jaw bone of a horse, both of which tore off the back of the head. However, the tomahawk made from a horse's jawbone visually appeared to cause considerably greater damage. The velocity of the stone tomahawk was measured, but the results were not relayed on the airing of the show. Alan Tafoya then threw iron tomahawks at wood targets and penetrated deep into them, two striking at 29 mph, and one at 32 mph. The cestus and scissor, wielded by Chuck Liddell, were tested on a 400-lb piece of beef. The cestus broke its ribs while the scissor almost cut it in half. Before the cestus test, Chuck Liddell's natural punching speed and power were measured: Liddell's punching speed was clocked at 14 meters per second—almost 50 percent faster than the average Olympic boxer—while his punching power was judged to deliver 1000 pounds of force—enough to break most facial bones on contact. The cestus effectively tripled this. A divided panel gave the edge to the versatility of the tomahawk.
- For mid-range weapons, the knife was tested against the trident and net. The knife's versatility was demonstrated when Snake Blocker threw three knives at three targets in under three seconds. Snake Blocker also demonstrated Apache knife fighting techniques, such as the "piercing buffalo", on a dummy garbed as a gladiator and wearing a gladiator's helmet. The trident, wielded by Chris Torres, was then tested on a gel torso and managed to puncture its heart with the main prong, a side prong puncturing the spleen. The trident and net was given the edge due to its flexibility as an offensive-defensive combo.
- For long-range weapons, the sling was tested against the bow and arrow. Steven Dietrich launched a lead sling shot at 91 mph. The shot was then simulated by an air cannon which drove a lead sling shot into a gel head and shattered the upper jaw, penetrating just past the nose. Alan Tafoya, wielding the bow and arrow, first fired an arrow at a wooden target as the velocity of the arrow was clocked; the arrow's velocity was measured at roughly 65 miles per hour. Tafoya then fired multiple arrows at a gel torso in quick succession, landing multiple death strikes, including a shot between two ribs, a shot to the neck that would have severed the spinal cord, and a shot along the jawline that would have jutted into the base of the brain. The edge was given to the bow and arrow due to its superior range, accuracy, and lethality.
- For special weapons, the sica was tested against the war club. Steven Dietrich was able to almost cut off a gel arm with the sica, cutting cleanly through skin and muscle tissue to the bone. The war club, wielded by Snake Blocker, was then tested on two targets: a bare skull and a Gladiator's helmet. It completely shattered the skull but was broken against the helmet. The sica was given the edge for its cutting ability and the club's failure.
- The Apache is the first of thirteen warriors to win after scoring more kills at mid range and long range.
- The trident and net is the first weapon to be given the edge and score fewer kills than the opposing weapon.
- According to the given statistics, the Gladiator had a size advantage of 1 inch and 45 lbs, with heavier gear of up to 28 lbs difference. The Gladiator is the heaviest warrior featured in Season 1.
- The Gladiator is the first warrior to have more weapons than his opponent (Gladiator 5, Apache 4).

=== Reenactment 1 ===
The warriors encounter each other in a grassy field. The Gladiator advances on the Apache, trident raised. The Apache fires an arrow at the Gladiator, hitting his shield, and easily dodges a sling shot riposte from the Gladiator. The Apache's second arrow hits the closing Gladiator in the stomach. He pulls the arrow out, slings another stone at the retreating Apache, but misses. The Apache fires another arrow before further retreating into the trees.

The Gladiator catches up, and attacks with trident and net. The Apache tries to block with his shield, but it is thrown aside by the trident. The Apache swings his tomahawk at the Gladiator. The two fight hand-to-hand, but the Gladiator kicks the Apache to the ground. He advances with his trident while the Apache tries to avoid the weapon. The trident gets stuck in a tree branch, but the Gladiator quickly frees it and continues to attack. With few options left, the Apache tries a run. The Gladiator, however, quickly throws his net, tripping and ensnaring the Apache. The Gladiator throws the trident at the Apache, but he just manages to roll away and escape from the net. He throws a tomahawk, which sails past the Gladiator's helmet.

They now fight with sica and war club. The Gladiator tries to cut the Apache with the sica, but the Apache knocks it out of his hand with the war club. His second swing knocks off the Gladiator's helmet. The Apache charges and tries to strike his opponent's exposed head with his club. However, the Gladiator knocks him to the ground with his shield then punches his face repeatedly with the cestus. The Apache got up with his knife. The Gladiator swings at him, but misses. The Apache then started to knife the Gladiator's limbs. He then cut the Gladiator's neck. The Apache then repeatedly knifes him, licks the blood off the knife, lets out a war cry, and flees.

Winner: Apache

== Episode 2: Viking vs. Samurai ==
Viking team: Casey Hendershot (Viking weapons instructor), Matt Nelson (Viking combat expert)
Viking weapons: Great axe, long sword, spear, shield
Viking armor: Steel helmet, chain mail, wooden shield
Viking statistics: Height: 5 feet 11 inches, Weight: 180 pounds, Gear: 65 pounds, Armor: Chain mail

Samurai team: Tetsuro Shigematsu (Samurai descendant), Brett Chan (Samurai weapons expert)
Samurai weapons: katana, naginata, yumi, kanabō
Samurai armor: Kabuto, Dō-Maru
Samurai statistics: Height: 5 feet 3 inches, Weight: 135 pounds, Gear: 65 pounds, Armor: Steel & Leather

Results
	Viking	Kills	Samurai	Kills
Short-range weapons	Great axe	134	katana	137
Mid-range weapons	Long sword	175	naginata	171
Long-range weapons	Spear	92	yumi	114
Special Weapons	Shield	77	Kanabo	100
Totals		478		522

- For short-range weapons, the katana was tested against the great axe. The katana was tested first against three tatami bamboo mats, rated as having the same density as human bone. All were cut in one clean swipe in under a third of a second. It was tested next on pig carcasses and cut through two pigs cleanly, severing vertebrae each time. Lastly, the katana was tested against the Viking's chainmail but failed to do any real damage. The great axe was first tested on a thick, short block of wood. The block was easily chopped in two, with the force being measured at 11,000 newtons (roughly 2000 pounds of force). Dr. Armand Dorian felt that a blow from such a weapon would be sufficient to sever a limb. The great axe was next used on a ballistics-gel torso, nearly cleaving the gel dummy in half in a downward chop, the blade reaching deeply beyond the heart and lungs. Dr. Dorian compared the injury to that of a trauma victim run over by a train. However, the great axe bounced off a Samurai helmet in a similar overhead chop. High-speed footage of the test indicated that a person wearing the helmet at the time of the strike would possibly suffer minor head trauma, but little more. A narrow advantage was given to the axe due to its greater killing power.
- For mid-range weapons, the long sword was tested against the naginata. The naginata proved itself as a quick ranged weapon by slicing a dummy with several quick cuts, taking off part of the skull and exposing brain matter in one, slashing through the face and jaw and slicing off part of the jawbone in the second, and breaking through a rib and stabbing the heart in the last test. The long sword was also very effective, making a very deep slash across the side of the head and into the brain cavity on its first strike, impaling the neck on the second and making a slash across the neck on the third. Geoff Desmoulin stated that the only thing which kept the gel skull from being completely decapitated by the long sword's strike was the metal supporting rod (which was itself chipped). The edge was given to the long sword due to its killing power.
- For long-range weapons, the Viking's spear was tested against the Samurai's yumi bow. The spear was thrown at targets 25 feet away and penetrated wood targets several inches thick. Two spears were also thrown at once and were found capable of the same degree of penetration. The yumi hit two dummies from 45 feet. Its accuracy was further demonstrated when dummy eyes were hit at a distance of 25 feet. The yumi was given the advantage due to its accuracy and range.
- For special weapons, the Viking's shield was tested against the Samurai's kanabo. The Viking's round shield proved itself effective both as a defensive shield and a bludgeoning weapon. A large, 35-pound version of the kanabo was tested and shattered a cow's femur as well as breaking off a part of the shield, although many of the studs in the club were knocked out in the process. The kanabo's force was measured at 470 psi, and it was theorized that an arm behind the shield would suffer at least one broken bone. In a comparison of killing ability, the kanabo was given the edge.
- The Samurai is one of six warrior-types with no battle cry at the end of the battle.
- The Samurai is one of three warrior-types to get at least 100 kills with each weapon.
- The Viking is the first warrior to lose despite having the most effective weapon in the fight, which was the long sword.
- The great axe is the second weapon to be given the edge and score fewer kills than the opposing weapon.
- According to the listed statistics, the Viking had a size advantage of 8 in (20 cm) and 45 lb (20 kg) the largest discrepancy in physical size of Season 1. The Samurai had lighter gear by 5 lb (2 kg). The Samurai is tied with the Ninja as the lightest warrior featured on Season 1.

=== Reenactment 2 ===
The Viking walks into a field and puts his great axe on the ground as the Samurai appears, holding a naginata and a yumi bow. The Samurai lets out a battle cry, and then fires an arrow at the Viking, hitting his chain-mailed shoulder. The Viking pulls out the arrow, only to be dazed by a second arrow striking his helmet. The Viking charges at the Samurai, hurling two spears when he gets close enough. The Samurai attempts to dodge them, but is struck by one and falls.

They next fight with great axe and naginata. The Viking swings his axe but is blocked by the naginata. The Samurai twists his naginata and forces the Viking's axe out of his hands. He hits the Viking with the naginata, but the damage is reduced by the Viking's chain mail. The Viking recovers his axe and swings viciously at the Samurai. With a heavy blow, he knocks the naginata out of the Samurai's hands and kicks him. The Viking swings his axe at the Samurai's back, but his armor protects him. The Samurai again knocks the axe out of the Viking's hands, this time with his kanabo club. He tries to swing at the Viking, who crouches and blocks with his shield. The Samurai savagely smashes off part of the shield with the kanabo and injures the Viking's arm. The Viking counter-attacks with his shield. He pushes the Samurai all the way to a bridge and then into a ditch below, where he loses his club.

The two warriors draw their swords and clash, with the Samurai getting in blows. The Viking swings at the Samurai but the long sword just slides off his armor. He tries again, but the Samurai moves out of the way and the Viking crashes into a tree. The Samurai slashes at the Viking's legs, forcing him to his knees. He stabs his katana straight down into the Viking's neck, killing him. He flips the Viking over and readies another stab to his heart, but sees that his opponent is dead. The Samurai sheathes his katana and limps off into the distance.

Winner: Samurai

== Episode 3: Spartan vs. Ninja ==
Spartan team: Jeremy Dunn (Spartan weapons expert), Barry Jacobsen (Spartan Historian)
Spartan weapons: Short sword, spear, javelin, shield
Spartan armor: Bronze cuirass, Corinthian helmet, aspis
Spartan statistics: Height: 5 feet 8 inches, Weight: 165 pounds, Armor: Bronze, Gear: 60 pounds

Ninja team: Lou Klein (Ninjitsu Master), Michael Lehr (Martial Arts Expert)
Ninja weapons: Ninjato, Black Eggs, Shuriken, Blowgun, Kusarigama
Ninja armor: None
Ninja statistics: Height: 5 feet 2 inches, Weight: 135 pounds, Armor: None, Gear: 10 pounds

Results
	Spartan	Kills	Ninja	Kills
Short-range weapons	Short sword	52	Ninjato	123
Mid-range weapons	Spear	210	Black Eggs	0
Long-range weapons	Javelin	9	Shuriken Blowgun	0 4
Special Weapons	Shield	382	Kusarigama	220
Totals		653		347

- For short-range weapons, each warrior's sword was tested against ballistics gel torsos. The ninjato was able to cut six inches into the shoulder, lacerating the arm's blood vessels and the lung, and causing death by bleed-out within a matter of seconds. The velocity of the ninjato was measured and while the results were not specifically stated on the show, it was stated that the ninjato's velocity surpassed that of the Spartan's dory spear. The Spartan xiphos short sword was thrust six or seven inches into the torso just below the ribcage, but hit the metal rod supporting the torso with enough force to bend the sword, preventing an accurate reading, but according to Spartan expert Barry Jacobsen, it would have severed a real spinal cord. It was also explained in the Ninja/Spartan episode of the Aftermath that the blow had already severed the main aorta, cause rapid death. Both weapons were also tested on pig carcasses. The ninjato was able to cut clean through the pig in two slices (cutting through the pelvis and the spine) as well as the short sword. The edge was given to the ninjato due to its power, lightness, superior range, and quickness.
- For mid-range weapons, the Spartan's spear was tested against the Ninja's black egg. The dory spear was first tested on a dummy while its thrusting force was measured; Geoff Desmoulin claimed that the measured force of the thrust was equivalent to a two-story fall onto the same spear if it were to be held up vertically. The dory was next thrust at a gel torso where it proved to be a devastating blow, breaking ribs, piercing the heart and a lung, and exiting the back. Dr. Armand Dorian claimed that a person struck with such a blow would die within 30 seconds. Black eggs containing both crushed glass and pepper juice were thrown at a Spartan helmet where it was proved to be blindingly effective. The spear got the edge since it could kill the opponent, whereas the egg was only a distraction tactic.
- For long-range weapons, neither the shuriken nor the javelin proved itself effective as the shuriken failed to produce more than minor wounds and the javelin proved slow and inaccurate. The javelin penetrated 2.5-3 inches into a ballistics gel torso, striking the pancreas. The shurikens' velocity were clocked at 48-49 mph, with Dr. Armand Dorian claiming that one of the shuriken blows to a stand-in could have broken a rib and pierced a lung. Another Ninja weapon, the blowgun, was also tested, with Dr. Dorian explaining that the weapon's lethality came from a toxin derived from the puffer fish, which can kill within 30 seconds upon entering the bloodstream. While it also failed to show great killing power on its own, its speed and poison darts gave it the edge.
- Being a vital part of Spartan combat, the Spartan's aspis shield was tested against the Ninja's kusarigama in special weapons, and proved itself to be a strong defensive advantage as well as able to deal a killing blow. When it was tested on a dummy an edge-strike inflicted 45Gs, enough to cause a depressed skull fracture, brain laceration, leading to almost immediate death and was likened to low-speed collisions or IED explosions. While the blade of the kusarigama was unable to penetrate the bronze cuirass of the Spartan, the ball & chain proved to be able to distract, disarm, and incapacitate the Spartan. Nevertheless, the shield got the edge due to its defense ability and versatility.
- The black eggs and the shuriken are the first two weapons to score zero kills in the simulations.
- The Spartan is the second of thirteen warriors to win after scoring more kills at mid range and long range.
- The blowgun is the third weapon to be given the edge and score fewer kills than the opposing weapon.
- The ninja is one of the least-effective warriors depicted in the simulation, often unable to even wound the Spartan.
- The final result was, in large part, due to the effect of the Spartan shield which hugely affected the results. It achieved more kills than any other ancient era weapon during this style of simulation, as well as offering the Spartan a major defensive edge that reduced the killing ability of the Ninja's weapons.
- According to the listed statistics, the Spartan had a size advantage of 6 inches and 30 lbs. However, the Ninja's gear was 50 lbs lighter. The Ninja is the shortest warrior featured in Season 1, and is tied with the Samurai as the lightest.
- The Ninja is the second warrior to have more weapons than his opponent (Ninja 5, Spartan 4).

=== Reenactment 3 ===
The Spartan stands in a forest, spear and shield in hand. Hidden in the treetops above, the Ninja watches him. He quietly jumps down and sneaks up behind the Spartan. As he approaches, he draws his ninjato. When close enough, he yells and swings his sword. Alerted, the Spartan quickly blocks the sword with his shield. He turns and thrusts his spear, but the Ninja rolls away to hide in the thick grass. The Spartan thrusts his javelin into the ground for later use. He hears the Ninja and turns to see him spinning the ball and chain of his kusarigama. He throws the ball at the Spartan, who blocks with his shield. The Ninja starts to swing his kusarigama again, but the Spartan charges with the spear and misses. The Ninja swings the ball at the Spartan again but, as before, the Spartan blocks with his shield. He swings it around a third time, but at the Spartan's leg. The chain wraps around and trips the Spartan, sending him to the floor. The Spartan sits up and grabs the chain. The Ninja tries to pull the kusarigama away from the Spartan, but the Spartan keeps a firm grip. In a desperate move, the Ninja breaks the kusarigama's chain and rushes at the Spartan with the remaining sickle part. The Spartan knocks him away with his shield and gets back up. The Spartan tries to stab him with his spear, but the Ninja kicks the shield and runs away.

The Spartan chases and catches up to him, trying to thrust his spear again. The Ninja dodges and breaks the spear in half with his sickle. He tries to stab the Spartan with the broken spear, but the Spartan blocks with his shield. This time, the Spartan swings his shield and sends the Ninja flying back. The Spartan unsheathes his short sword and advances towards the Ninja. The Ninja pulls out a black egg and waits for the Spartan to get close. He then jumps in front of the Spartan, kicks the shield, and throws the egg at the Spartan's face. The Spartan blindly swings at the air as the Ninja back-flips off the shield and retreats. When the Spartan regains his vision, he sees the Ninja running away and pursues him.

The Spartan finds himself in a deeper, darker part of the forest. He slowly walks through the trees, javelin in hand, shield up, looking for the Ninja. The Ninja pops out from behind a tree and tries to shoots him with his blowgun. The Spartan blocks the darts and throws his javelin. The javelin lands off-target, allowing the Ninja to run away. He pulls out some shurikens and turns to throw them, only to find that the Spartan has caught up. He quickly throws one, but the shield protects the Spartan as he knocks over the Ninja. The Spartan unsheathes his short sword again and swings at the Ninja, who dodges. The Ninja jumps onto a tree and prepares to leap at the Spartan with his sword, but the Spartan impales the Ninja on his sword and pins him to the tree, stabbing him to death and yelling "Sparta".

Winner: Spartan

== Episode 4: Pirate vs. Knight ==
Pirate team: Michael Triplett (pirate weapons master), David Hernandez (sword fighting instructor)
Pirate weapons: Cutlass, boarding axe, blunderbuss, flintlock pistol, grenado
Pirate armor: None
Pirate statistics: Year: 1715, Height: 5 feet 10 inches, Weight: 170 pounds, Armor: None, Gear: 20 pounds, Loyalty: money

Knight team: David Coretti (Army veteran/sword expert), Josh Paugh (Medieval weapons expert)
Knight weapons: Broadsword, halberd, crossbow, morningstar
Knight armor: Plate armor
Knight statistics: Year: 1423, Height: 5 feet 11 inches, Weight: 180 pounds, Armor: Plate, Gear: 70 pounds, Loyalty: France

Results
	Pirate	Kills	Knight	Kills
Short-range weapons	Cutlass Boarding axe	25 13	Broadsword	103
Mid-range weapons	Blunderbuss	352	Halberd	108
Long-range weapons	Flintlock pistol	41	Crossbow	106
Special weapons	Grenado	198	Morningstar	54
Totals		629		371

- This is the only episode in which armor was up against a weapon in an edged category.
- For short-range weapons, both swords were tested against pig carcasses which were mounted on ziplines to simulate motion. The broadsword cleaved its pig in half, while the cutlass almost managed to do the same. The contest was declared a draw with both showing high killing power even though the Knight's steel armor was not shown to be tested.
- For mid-range weapons the blunderbuss was tested against the halberd. The blunderbuss, despite a misfire, was able to put a hole through a layer of double Plate armor with one of its pellets. The "halberd" (actually a poleaxe) was a shown to be a deadly and versatile weapon, as it tore of the back of a ballistic gel torso's skull with one strike to the temple with the axe blade (exposing a large amount of brain matter), pierced the abdomen and the throat with the pike end, and tore the skull in half with two more swings of the axe blade. However, because of the blunderbuss' power of penetration, range, and concussion, it was given the edge.
- Both long-range weapons were tested on dummies, with the crossbow bolt penetrating deeply into an unprotected dummy, striking 2.5 inches into the torso and striking the upper part of the liver and the pancreas at a speed of 115.8 feet per second, or roughly 78 mph. The flintlock, meanwhile, was able to dent but not penetrate the breastplate on its dummy. Furthermore, Michael Triplett called his shot but missed, indicating inaccuracy in the flintlock. The crossbow took the edge thanks to its killing power, range, and accuracy, and the deficiencies of the flintlock.
- For special weapons, the morningstar was tested against the grenado. The morningstar proved to be a fast and deadly short-range weapon when it shattered a dummy skull. An initial swing struck the top of a ballistic gel's torso's skull with the morningstar's chain, shattering the left cheekbone and the jaw. A second strike broke the spinal cord and a third completely shattered the skull, removing all brain matter from the brainpan. The morningstar was registered at 1300 psi—over 17 times the amount of force needed to fracture a human skull. The grenado was detonated near several pig carcasses, one having an armor plate. The grenado produced a great blast, with the shrapnel tearing holes in the unprotected flesh of all three pigs. However, it failed to penetrate the armor at close range. With both weapons effective, the win was given to the grenado for its concussion, shock value, and shrapnel.
- The Plate armor was tested throughout the show, being effective against most of the Pirate weapons. The boarding axe put a very small hole in a Knight helmet, but did not penetrate it. The boarding axe's strike was measured at 33 psi, but Geoff Desmoulin claimed that the computer measured the section of the helmet just below the section where the axe's pike struck—implying that the actual psi for the strike was likely greater than 33 psi. The edge was given to the armor for its defence power.
- This is the first episode to have a tie in weapons edges.
- Both warriors did not bring one of their weapons in the final battle (the Pirate's boarding axe and the Knight's halberd.)
- This is the first of three episodes to have a warrior with at least one gunpowder-based weapon win over one who does not.
- The flintlock pistol is the first (and currently only) gunpowder-based weapon to be outperformed by a non-gunpowder weapon in the same category.
- According to the given statistics, the Knight had a size advantage of 1 inch and 10 lbs; roughly equal by the standards of Deadliest Warrior matchups. However, the Knight's gear was 50 lbs heavier.
- According to the years listed, the time differential between the two warriors is 308 years.
- The Knight has the heaviest gear of any warrior featured in Season 1.
- The Pirate is the third and last warrior to have more weapons than his opponent (Pirate 5, Knight 4, since the armor wasn't a weapon), and is the only warrior of the three to win the match.

=== Reenactment 4 ===
The Pirate discovers a dusty treasure chest in the middle of a forest. In the distance, the Knight approaches on horseback and the Pirate hears the hoofbeats as he counts gold doubloons. Thinking the Knight intends to steal his treasure, the Pirate pulls out a flintlock pistol. At this, the Knight swings his morning star and spurs his horse to charge. The Pirate aims and fires, but misses. He fires a second pistol but the bullet bounces off the Knight's armor. The Knight's horse dashes at the Pirate and the Knight misses him with the morning star, merely knocking off his hat.

The Pirate hides behind a tree, desperately fumbling for the grenado in his pocket. The Knight wheels and charges again. The Pirate lights the grenado fuse and throws it; the explosion knocks the Knight off his horse. The Pirate slowly approaches, thinking the Knight is dead but he sits up and fires a crossbow bolt, hitting the Pirate's leg. As the Pirate painfully pulls the bolt out, the Knight gets up and swings at him with the morning star, grazing him and causing him to fall. However, the Pirate uses his blunderbuss to shoot the Knight, sending him flying backward. The Pirate runs off with the treasure chest, once again believing that he has killed the Knight. He reaches the shore and sees his ship in the distance. He groans, "Oh, bloody hell" as he realizes that the injured Knight is still following him. He fires his third flintlock pistol. The Knight's armor protects him and he runs towards the Pirate.

They close and engage with cutlass and broadsword. Both get their swords stuck in the sand, and the Knight seizes the chance to kick the Pirate to the ground. He tries to strike the Pirate, who rolls out of the way and backs towards the bottom of a cliff, while the Knight slowly advances. The Knight attacks, but the Pirate parries with his cutlass and kicks him to the ground. The Knight rises and clumsily swings at the Pirate, who dodges and throws sand in the Knight's face, distracting him long enough to charge at him and throw him to the ground. As the Knight tries to regain his wits, the Pirate quickly crawls to retrieve his fourth flintlock pistol, picks it up, and walks toward the Knight. The Pirate opens the Knight's visor and fires point blank. The Pirate gets up and roars in victory.

Winner: Pirate

== Episode 5: Yakuza vs. Mafia ==
Yakuza team: Zero Kazama (Yakuza weapons expert), David Kono (Yakuza descendant/historian)
Yakuza weapons: Nunchakus, Walther P38, Sten gun, ceramic grenade, sai
Yakuza armor: None
Yakuza statistics: Year: 1947, Height: 5 feet 6 inches, Weight: 150 pounds, Armor: none, Gear: 10 pounds

Mafia team: Joe Ferrante (Mafia weapons expert), Thomas Bonanno (Mafia descendant/historian)
Mafia weapons: Baseball bat, Sawed-off shotgun, Tommy gun, Molotov cocktail, ice pick
Mafia armor: None
Mafia statistics: Year: 1929, Height: 5 feet 10 inches, Weight: 170 pounds, Armor: none, Gear: 10 pounds

Results
	Yakuza	Kills	Mafia	Kills
Short-range weapons	Nunchakus	9	Baseball bat	23
Mid-range weapons	Walther P38	10	Sawed-off shotgun	38
Long-range weapons	Sten gun	359	Tommy gun	499
Explosive Weapons	Ceramic grenade	26	Molotov cocktail	2
Special weapons	Sai	10	Ice pick	24
Totals		414		586

- The nunchakus were tested against the baseball bat. The bat broke a pig's spine with a single swing, which was clocked at over 100 mph, breaking five segments of the spinal cord. Zero Kazama is then seen delivering a roundhouse kick against another pig apparently breaking the spine though the results are not explained. Zero states Nunchaku are distraction weapons. The nunchakus were tested on a gel head and managed to crack its skull in three hits. Joe Ferrante performed an impromptu demonstration of the bat on the same torso and caused more damage in one swing (though this would have been inaccurate because the skull was already broken). In the end, the bat was given the edge for its sheer power.
- The Walther P38 was tested against the sawed-off double-barrel shotgun. The P38 proved to have deadly accuracy, managing to hit a synthetic skull (filled with brains) through the left eye socket. The sawed-off shotgun was tested on a dummy, hitting its target in the torso and cheek. The shotgun was given the edge due to its superior killing power.
- The Tommy gun and Sten were both tested against single and multiple targets. The Tommy gun was given the edge due to its larger caliber/greater stopping power, faster rate of fire, and larger magazine.
- The ice pick was tested against the sai. The ice pick was able to stab a gel torso in the neck and through its head. The sai was tested on a blood-filled foam torso, and was able to put multiple stab wounds in it. The sai was given the edge due to its versatility. The ice pick was included as a weapon only because it was commonplace; the sai, however, was actually designed for use as a weapon.
- The ceramic grenade was tested against the Molotov cocktail. The ceramic grenade was able to take out three targets: one was confused, one was disoriented, and the other was dead. The Molotov cocktail was tested on two dummies in a car. When thrown, it put the car in a "mini-firestorm" and slowly burned the dummies. The ceramic grenade was given the edge due to its ability to put its victims in a completely defenseless state, whereas the Molotov's victims were not immediately incapacitated.
- This was the first ever squad-on-squad battle in the show.
- This is the first episode that involves neutral nonparticipants in the simulation: A couple gets caught in the initial crossfire at the start of the fight.
- Despite not being tested, in the simulation, the Mafia can be seen with a pistol (possibly the M1911) and stiletto knife and one of the Yakuza members can be seen with a katana.
- The Mafia is one of six warriors with no battle cry at the end of the battle.
- The Tommy gun scored the most kills of any firearm in the first two seasons.
- The Mafia are the third warriors of thirteen to win after scoring more kills at mid range and long range.
- The sai is the fourth weapon to be given the edge while scoring fewer kills than the opposing weapon.
- According to the listed statistics, the Mafia had a size advantage of 4 inches and 20 lbs. Gear weight was equal. The time differential between the two warriors as listed is 18 years. As a side note, this was the third episode of four consecutive episodes to feature warriors of Japanese descent; of these, the Yakuza were both the physically largest and the chronologically most modern.
- With just the Tommy gun and Molotov cocktail, the Mafia could have won the match.
- The Mafia is one of the three warriors with a single weapon that could grant them victory easily, which was the Tommy gun.

=== Reenactment 5 ===
The battle begins with a group of five Yakuza members entering a hotel. A nearby man and his wife checking into the hotel look on nervously as they see five Mafia members turn the corner and run into the Yakuza. Both gangs stare at each other until one Mafia gangster produces a Molotov cocktail and its rag is lit by another gangster. Seeing this, a Yakuza gangster alerts his teammates, one of whom fires his Sten machine gun, killing the onlooker's wife as well as the Mafia gangster with the Molotov. He falls to the floor and drops the Molotov, rendering it useless. The Mafia boss pulls out his double-barreled shotgun and aims at the Yakuza boss, who draws his Walther P38 and grabs the surviving bystander as a shield. The Mafia boss aims instead at the greater threat and shoots the man carrying the Sten. He falls dead behind a couch.

The Mafia and Yakuza members scatter in different directions, with one of the Mafia members jumping behind the check-in counter. Another Mafia thug fires his Tommy gun; a Yakuza member lights a ceramic grenade and throws it. It lands behind the check-in counter and explodes, killing the Mafia gangster hiding there. At this point, the Mafia has already retreated to different parts of the hotel, so the remaining Yakuza members pursue them.

The Yakuza boss finds a Mafia member trying to escape in an elevator. He runs and gets caught in the elevator's doors. The Mafia man inside desperately tries to reload his pistol, but the Yakuza boss manages to get inside the elevator first. He grabs the Mafia man and shoves him into a wall; this causes them both to drop their guns. The Mafia member pulls out a switchblade knife and the Yakuza boss draws his two sai. The Mafia member tries to stab the Yakuza boss but is countered with a swift punch to the side. The Yakuza boss swings his sai and slashes the Mafia member's face. The Mafia member attempts a knife blow but the Yakuza boss stabs him in the stomach. The Mafia thug falls to the floor, allowing the Yakuza boss to fire two bullets into him as the elevator doors open. He steps out, looking for other Mafia members.

Meanwhile, the Mafia boss and his last henchman make their way down a flight of stairs. The henchman tells his boss to continue down and kills one of the oncoming Yakuza members with his Tommy gun. However, another Yakuza gangster follows up, kills the Mafia thug with his P38 and then continues down the stairs.

In the basement, the Mafia boss hides behind a locker door. He attempts to reload his shotgun but is so nervous that he accidentally drops the shells. Just as he is about to pick them up, he hears the Yakuza thug enter the room. As the Yakuza thug is examining the lockers, the Mafia boss finds a baseball bat in the locker in which he is hiding. He jumps out of the locker, knocks the gun out of the Yakuza member's hands and then hits him in the stomach with the bat. The Yakuza henchman pulls out his nunchucks and whirls them around to intimidate his opponent. The boss furiously swings with the bat. The Yakuza thug counters with his Nunchucks but the Mafia boss ducks and strikes him in the leg and head. Helpless, he is beaten to death by the Mafia boss.

After retrieving and reloading his shotgun, the Mafia boss makes his way to the boiler room. As he enters, the Yakuza boss jumps out and tries to shoot him with his P38. The Mafia boss fires back with his shotgun, but neither manages a hit. Eventually, the Mafia boss runs out of ammunition again and tries to reload. The Yakuza boss seizes the chance and puts the P38 to his head. He pulls the trigger but his gun is also empty. The Mafia boss swings his shotgun into the Yakuza's stomach then discards it in favor of his switchblade. The Yakuza boss resorts to his sai once more. The two vigorously swing at each other, avoiding the other's weapon. The Yakuza boss kicks the Mafia boss into a boiler and charges at him, but the Mafia boss kicks back and pushes him away. The two recover and briefly glare at each other before resuming. Eventually, the Mafia boss shoves the Yakuza boss into the boiler and tries to stab him. The Yakuza boss avoids the blow and the Mafia boss inadvertently punctures a pipe. Steam spews out. He accidentally drops his knife, allowing the Yakuza boss to close with him. Just before the Yakuza boss can stab him with one of his sai, the Mafia boss pulls out his ice pick as a last resort and stabs the Yakuza's arm, causing him to drop a sai. He seizes the Yakuza boss by his hair and slams his head into the punctured pipe, burning his face. He pulls the Yakuza boss's head to the side so that his neck is exposed and slowly drives in the ice pick. The Yakuza slumps to the ground. The Mafia boss throws away his ice pick, lights a cigar in celebration and walks away.

Winner: Mafia

== Episode 6: Green Berets vs. Spetsnaz ==
Green Beret team: Matt Anderson (Former Green Beret), Sgt. George Gomez (Former Green Beret)
Green Beret weapons: Beretta pistol, Mossberg shotgun, M4A1 Carbine, M24 Rifle, M67 grenade, E-Tool
Green Beret armor: None
Green Beret statistics: Height: 6 feet 1 inches, Weight: 180 pounds, Gear: 29 pounds, Force Size: 4,500

Spetsnaz team: Sonny Puzikas (Former Spetsnaz Operative), Maxim Franz (Former Spetsnaz Operative)
Spetsnaz weapons: Makarov pistol, Saiga shotgun, AK74 Carbine, Dragunov Rifle, RGD-5 grenade, Ballistic Knife
Spetsnaz armor: None
Spetsnaz statistics: Height: 5 feet 11 inches, Weight: 175 pounds, Gear: 27 pounds, Force Size: 15,000

Results
	Green Berets	Kills	Spetsnaz	Kills
Short-range weapons	Beretta pistol	4	Makarov pistol	12
Mid-range weapons	Mossberg shotgun	42	Saiga shotgun	104
Long-range automatic weapons	M4A1 Carbine	311	AK74 Carbine	288
Long-range sniper weapons	M24 Rifle	85	Dragunov rifle	84
Explosive weapons	M67 grenade	36	RGD-5 grenade	24
Special weapons	E-Tool	3	Ballistic knife	7
Totals		481		519

- The Green Berets weapons that were tested were not specific to US Army Special Operations, but were actually standard Infantry weapons that are common to all US Army combat troops. The Spetsnaz, by contrast, utilized their peak capabilities in armament.
- Both pistols were shot at targets while navigating a specially designed target course using a night vision device. The Spetsnaz was able to eliminate all three targets without causing friendly casualties. While the Green Beret was able to navigate the same course in less time (completing the course five seconds sooner than the Spetsnaz) and also without friendly casualties, the Green Beret was only able to kill one target, leaving one target able to fight back in wounded condition and the final target nearly unscathed. The Makarov won due to its shooter's skill despite having a smaller magazine.
- The Mossberg was shot at a pig and put four rounds in under four seconds. The Saiga was shot at four targets in under three seconds. The edge was given to the Saiga due to its semi-auto capability.
- The AK74 and M4 were determined to be equal as the users shot all the targets, ending this test as a tie.
- The Dragunov and M24 were tested on multiple targets. The Dragunov missed its targets by at least an inch to either side, while the M24 hit all its targets right in the center. The M24 took the advantage due to its greater accuracy.
- The ballistic knife went up against the E-tool. The E-tool was tested on a gel torso and managed to remove the brain, as well as slicing into the intestines, causing them to spill out of the body cavity. The ballistic knife was tested on three glass orbs and penetrated all three, at a velocity of 58 feet per second, or 39 mph. In a very close comparison, the ballistic knife was chosen due to its ranged capability and portability.
- The RGD5 was detonated inside of a washing machine surrounded by standees and managed to take out one standee and put a piece of the machine in another standee at 40 feet. The M67 was detonated in a clear box with two dummies and a pig, and managed to take them all out. The M67 won due to its larger blast radius.
- This is the second episode to have a tie in weapons edges.
- Both warriors did not bring one of their weapons in the final battle (neither team brought their sniper rifles and the Spetsnaz did not use their grenades or pistols).
- The Spetsnaz leader is tied with Hernán Cortés and Crazy Horse for most humans killed in the battle with 4 each.
- The Green Berets are the second warriors to lose despite having the most effective weapon in the fight, which was the M4A1 Carbine.
- According to the given statistics, the Green Berets had a negligible size advantage of 2 inches (52 mm) and 5 lbs, with Spetznaz having an equally negligible advantage in lighter gear at 2 lbs. However, in an unrestrained encounter that went according to the force size statistics listed, Spetznaz would have a numerical advantage of 10,500 soldiers, or a margin of nearly 3 to 1. The Green Berets are the tallest warriors featured in Season 1.

=== Reenactment 6 ===
The battle begins in the remains of a completely abandoned city. The five-man Spetsnaz squad makes its way to a building blocked by a locked gate. One of the Spetsnaz breaks the lock with the butt of his AK74 carbine and opens the gate to let his fellow soldiers in. Meanwhile, the five Green Berets approach from another part of the city and enter by a different gate. The Green Beret leader carefully walks up to a door and throws his M67 grenade through a broken window. It explodes, causing panic and confusion to the Spetsnaz soldiers inside. He quickly enters and kills the first Spetsnaz he sees with his M4A1 carbine. One of his soldiers walks with him into a room, only to be shot by a Spetsnaz's Saiga shotgun. The leader quickly reacts and kills his opponent with his M4A1. Two other Green Berets enter a hallway, unaware that the Spetsnaz commander and two of his soldiers are nearby. A Spetsnaz enters the hallway and gets in a gunfight with one of the Green Berets. The second Green Beret sneaks up to the entrance of the room the Spetsnaz soldier is in and throws a grenade inside, killing him. The two Green Berets make their way to another room, where they hear another Spetsnaz soldier trying to scare them away with gunfire. One jumps in and kills the Spetsnaz with his Mossberg shotgun.

Meanwhile, the Spetsnaz leader, now alone, waits crouched beneath a window while a Green Beret searches, oblivious to his presence. When he passes by, the Spetsnaz commander shoots him with his AK74. He turns around and kills another Green Beret who is attempting to sneak up on him. He gently kicks the dead soldier to check he is dead then leaves the room. He sees his third Green Beret victim entering the hallway and kills him before he can react. The Green Beret leader enters the hallway just in time to see his last comrade being killed. He tries to shoot the Spetsnaz commander, but the commander manages to run into another room. The Green Beret leader enters the room and spots the Spetsnaz leader trying to hide. He shoots out all the lights in the room with his M4A1, leaving the Spetsnaz leader in darkness. The Green Beret leader puts on his night vision goggles and pulls out his Beretta pistol. The Spetsnaz leader readies his AK74, but the Green Beret leader fires wildly at him and shoots the gun out of his hands before running out of ammunition. Without a firearm, the Spetsnaz leader tries to escape into the next room. The Green Beret leader takes several more shots but is unable to hit the Spetsnaz. The Spetsnaz finds himself in a boiler room and a dead end. He turns around to see the Green Beret enter the room with his E-tool held loosely at his side.

Both then close with their melee weapons, the Green Beret his E-tool and the Spetsnaz his ballistic knife. The Green Beret feints frantically and manages to knock the knife out of the Spetsnaz's hands. He charges at the Spetsnaz and slams him into a wall. The Spetsnaz leader tries to push him away, but is continually pushed against walls. He forces the E-tool up to the Green Beret leader's neck and the two get into a final struggle. At first, the Green Beret gets the upper hand and knocks the Spetsnaz leader to the floor. The Spetsnaz kicks the Green Beret away, giving himself enough time to pull out a spare ballistic knife tucked away in his boot. The Green Beret prepares to swing his E-tool, but the Spetsnaz presses a button on the knife. The blade shoots out from the handle and flies into the Green Beret's neck. The Green Beret leader slowly falls to the ground. The Spetsnaz leader gets up and watches the Green Beret leader twitch weakly and die. He yells "Ya Spetsnaz!" (I am Spetsnaz) and boasts "No one will ever defeat us" in Russian before leaving the room.

Winner: Spetsnaz

== Episode 7: Shaolin Monk vs. Maori Warrior ==
Shaolin Monk team: Eric Chen (Kung Fu master/historian), Wang Wei (Wushu national champion), Alfred Hsing (Chinese weapons expert)
Shaolin Monk weapons: Emei piercers, staff, twin hooks, whip chain
Shaolin Monk armor: None
Shaolin Monk statistics: Height: 5 feet 7 inches, Weight: 145 pounds, Armor: None, Gear: 5 pounds

Maori Warrior team: Seamus Fitzgerald (Maori weapons historian), Jared Wihongi (special forces instructor), Sala Baker (Maori weapons specialist)
Maori Warrior weapons: Mere, taiaha, stingray spear, shark tooth club
Maori Warrior armor: None
Maori Warrior statistics: Height: 5 feet 9 inches, Weight: 180 pounds, Armor: None, Gear: 8 pounds

Results
	Shaolin Monk	Kills	Maori Warrior	Kills
Short-range weapons	Emei piercers	31	Mere	78
Mid-range weapons	Staff Twin hooks	57 566	Taiaha Stingray spear	151 6
Special weapons	Whip chain	38	Shark tooth club	73
Totals		692		308

- For short-range weapons, the emei piercers were tested against the mere club. Alfred demonstrated the emei piercers' speed, accuracy and killing potential as he turned a gel torso's head inside out with repeated stabs (four kill shots in roughly as many seconds). The mere club annihilated a bull skull (which is twice as thick as a human skull) with ease. Dr. Dorian claimed that the strike, which took off the frontal portion of the bull skull, was analogous to a mid-face fracture. The experts for the Maori wanted to prove that the mere was stronger than steel, so they set up a suitable test to do this. Sala tried to smash through a row of bricks with a steel knife and managed to smash through one, but the Mere smashed through three, giving it the edge.
- For the first mid-range weapon match-up, the twin hooks were put up against the stingray spear. The twin hooks cut cleanly through the ribs of a pig carcase. Putting both swords together doubled the weapon's range, a feature that was demonstrated while cutting through a gel torso's abdomen to the liver, leaving a deep, geometrically aligned wound which effectively destroyed the abdomen's vital organs. The stingray spear was stabbed into a gel torso's abdomen. As this was judged to not be a kill shot, Sala Baker repeated the test with a new stingray spear, this time aiming for the region just below the ribcage. He succeeded in inflicting a kill shot, striking vital organs and possibly reaching the spinal cord. The stingray spear caused severe damage, but not as much as the twin hooks, and the twin hooks were given the edge for this and re-usability, as the stingray spear was deemed a "one-shot" weapon.
- For the second mid-range weapon match-up, the taiaha was tested against the staff. Although the staff shattered clay pots with great speed and precision (four pots in 2.643 seconds), the taiaha proved more effective by piercing two cow spines (which are three times thicker than a human spine). Earlier, the taiaha was also tested against a pressure sensor, generating over 200 psi of force. The fact that the staff was used more as a defensive weapon was a determining factor in the tests, and the taiaha was given the edge for being designed to kill its target.
- In special weapons, the whip chain was tested against the shark tooth club. Although the whip chain showed killing potential and precision (destroying five glass orbs in two strikes), the shark tooth club was able not only to cut a leg of beef, but to keep cutting even when some of the teeth broke off inside the target. The shark tooth club was given the edge.
- The Maori Warrior was the first of only three warrior-types to receive the edge in three out of four tests, the others being the SWAT team and Vlad the Impaler. The Maori Warrior is also the only warrior so far to lose the match despite having the edge in 3 out of 4 tests.
- This is the first episode which does not feature a long-range weapons category, as well as being the only ancient match in which neither warrior has any kind of projectile, armor or shield.
- The Shaolin Monk's meteor hammer was used in the reenactment, although it was not tested.
- The Shaolin Monk is one of six warrior with no battle cry at the end of the battle.
- Out of the first two seasons the twin hooks got the most kills, and was the first weapon of the original format that had enough kills to grant the warrior the win alone.
- The Shaolin Monk is the first of two warrior with at least one metal weapon to triumph over an opponent who has none.
- According to the listed statistics, the Maori Warrior had a size advantage of 2 inches and 35 lbs, with gear that is only 3 pounds heavier. The Shaolin Monk had the lightest gear of any warrior featured in Season 1.

=== Reenactment 7 ===
As the Shaolin Monk trains in a field he hears loud noises nearby and finds the Maori Warrior performing his "Ka Mate" haka. The Maori dances in front of him and sticks out his tongue, meaning that he intends to eat him. The Monk slowly walks up to the Maori and bows; he responds by charging, swinging his stingray spear. The Monk swiftly back-flips to dodge the spear. The Maori sticks his tongue out again, but the Monk calmly produces a meteor hammer. He tries to strike the Maori, but the stingray spear frustrates the attempt, so the Monk swings the meteor hammer and wraps its rope around the spear. The two pull on the rope to gain control of the spear. The Maori then angrily throws the spear, causing the Monk to fall back. The Monk quickly back-flips to keep his balance and remain standing. He makes a run for the trees; the Maori gives chase.

As he runs, the Monk retrieves his twin hooks and staff from behind a tree. He eventually turns to face the Maori, who is now armed with his taiaha. The Monk chooses to fight with his whip chain. He charges and swings fiercely. The Maori jumps out of the way and watches the Monk drop to the floor. He tries to close in with his taiaha, but the Monk keeps the Maori at bay with the whip chain. He bounces his body into the air briefly and swings the chain under him. He wraps it around the Maori's taiaha and pulls at it. The Maori manages to hold on to his weapon, but the distraction allows the Monk to get back up. The Maori thrusts his taiaha, but the Monk easily slides under it and runs to his staff and twin hooks.

The Maori chases the Monk to more open ground, where the Monk takes up a fighting stance with his staff. They fight, continuously blocking each other's moves. Finally, the taiaha breaks the Monk's staff. The Monk slowly backs up, trying to dodge repeated taiaha attacks, but is hit. The Maori tries to sweep the Monk off his feet but he flips into the air and avoids this. The Monk readies his twin hooks as the Maori attacks again. He effortlessly blocks the taiaha then hooks it from the Maori's hands. The Maori tries to come at him, but the Monk links the twin hooks together and swings them, cutting into the Maori's stomach. Infuriated, he charges at the Monk, sending him to the ground. The Monk kicks him away and quickly jumps back up.

Finally, they fight with emei piecers against shark tooth and mere clubs. The Maori attacks the Monk, who grabs his arm and pulls the mere club from his hand. The Maori swings his shark tooth club and hits the Monk. The Monk spins an emei piercer, momentarily distracting the Maori and allowing the Monk to punch him in the gut. The Monk tries to stab the Maori, but is blocked by the shark tooth club. He spins and elbows the Maori, then stabs him in both the neck and temple with his emei piercers. The Maori falls and the Monk bows his head in respect for the dead Maori Warrior.

Winner: Shaolin Monk

== Episode 8: William Wallace vs. Shaka Zulu ==
William Wallace team: Kieron Elliot (highlander weapons expert), Anthony Delongis (blademaster)
William Wallace weapons: War hammer, claymore, ball & chain, targe & dirk
William Wallace armor: Chain mail and targe

William Wallace statistics: c. 1270-1305 Scotland, Gear: 40 pounds, Armor: Chain Mail

Shaka Zulu team: Earl White (Zulu stick fighting master), Jason Bartley (Zulu combat expert)
Shaka Zulu weapons: Zulu axe, iklwa & ishlangu, iwisa, spit of poison
Shaka Zulu armor: Ishlangu
Shaka Zulu statistics: c. 1787-1828 Southeast Africa, Gear: 7-10 pounds, Armor: Ox-hide shield

Results
	William Wallace	Kills	Shaka Zulu	Kills
Short-range weapons	War hammer	65	Zulu axe	70
Mid-range weapons	Claymore	319	Iklwa & ishlangu	307
Long-range weapons	Ball & chain	1	Iwisa	2
Special weapons	Targe & dirk	236	Spit of poison	0
Totals		621		379

- This is the first battle between two historical individuals to be featured on the show.
- For short-range weapons, the war hammer was compared to the Zulu axe. The war hammer smashed one skull and impaled another in under two seconds. The hammer's pick penetrated four inches into the gel skull, generating enough blunt force to drive through the upper palate of the mouth and split the skull in half. The Zulu axe was used to chop up a leg of beef, being measured at a velocity of 23 mph. The Zulu axe was given the edge because of its longer reach and higher speed.
- For mid-range weapons, the claymore was put up against the iklwa. The claymore decapitated three meat heads in one swing, cutting straight through the joints of the meat necks and lopping the lower jaws off two of the three skulls. In a second test, it cleanly cut into a Zulu ishlangu shield and only stopped when it hit the load cell to which the shield was affixed. The claymore's strike was measured at 310 psi, with Geoff Desmoulin speculating that a Zulu warrior carrying the ishlangu would suffer at least one broken bone in his arm. For the iklwa test, a pig carcase was mounted on a zipline to simulate motion. The iklwa pierced a lung and severed the carcase's spinal cord. The weapon also penetrated a sample of unriveted chainmail and the ballistic-gel torso beneath, where it pierced the aorta and stopped an inch before the spinal cord. The claymore's range and performance proved to be the deciding factors, giving it the edge.
- For long-range weapons, the iwisa throwing club was paired against the ball and chain. After missing the target on the first two tries, the ball and chain successfully shattered an ice dummy with enough force to kill a human. It would have crushed the windpipe and broken the sternum, possibly confusing the heart. A pressure map situated beneath the ice sculpture measured the ball and chain's force at roughly 3200 joules of energy; equivalent to being struck by a motorcycle going at 16 mph. On test, the iwisa shattered a glass plate and two glass orbs at a velocity of 16 feet per second, or 32 mph. The accuracy, speed and range of the iwisa earned it the win.
- The special-weapons test paired the Scottish targe and dirk against the spit poison of the Zulu. The targe and dirk, as a combination, proved deadly. The long spike of the targe was able to puncture a gel torso's heart, and the dirk was capable of stabbing through the torso's brain stem causing paralysis and death. For the spit of poison test, Jason Bartley spat in the face of a test dummy to demonstrate its value as a distraction tactic but the results were questionable. The targe and dirk combination was given the edge due to its raw killing-power.
- This is the shortest simulation run, at one minute thirty-nine seconds.
- The spit of poison is the third weapon to have zero kills.
- According to the listed statistics, Shaka Zulu had a considerable advantage in lighter gear, by 30–33 lb (14–15 kg). The size differential between these two warriors is not listed. The time differential between Wallace's execution and Shaka Zulu's birth is 482 years.
- In addition one should compare motivations as an X-factor. Shaka Zulu would have fought to extend his empire, while William Wallace fought to resist an empire.

=== Reenactment 8 ===
Wallace advances along a valley and sees Shaka Zulu running at him. He throws his ball & chain at Shaka, but he rolls right under it. Shaka throws an iwisa (knobkerry) at Wallace, who blocks it with his targe and attacks with his war hammer. Shaka tries to counter with another iwisa. Wallace thrusts the targe and its spike pierces Shaka's leg. He tries to finish him with the war hammer, but Shaka rolls out of the way. Shaka comes at Wallace with the iwisa, but Wallace defends with his targe and knocks the iwisa out of Shaka's hands. Shaka uses his axe; Wallace ducks under the axe and blocks with his targe. He swings his war hammer, but Shaka blocks with his ishlangu shield and kicks Wallace away. He thrusts his iklwa at Wallace, who dodges and swings his war hammer at Shaka's legs. Shaka falls over and rolls out of the way of Wallace's targe, which has become stuck in the ground. Shaka feints to prevent Wallace picking it up. Wallace swings the war hammer, embedding it in Shaka's shield. Wallace wrenches the shield from Shaka's hands, throwing it and his hammer away.

Shaka rolls away and waits with iklwa and axe in hand. Wallace swings at Shaka's legs with his claymore, but Shaka jumps over it and falls to the ground awkwardly. Wallace tries to swing at Shaka, but is blocked by his axe. Shaka slashes Wallace's leg with his iklwa, forcing him back. He tries to hit Shaka with his claymore, but Shaka rolls away and dodges. Shaka turns and tries to run away. Wallace throws his dirk at Shaka, who deflects it with his iklwa.

Shaka starts to climb a hill, but pauses to ready his spit of poison before continuing up the hill. He spits the poison at Wallace's face as he approaches, but Wallace ducks to avoid it. Wallace knocks Shaka's axe it out of his hands with his claymore. Shaka swings his iklwa and slashes across Wallace's stomach. Wallace retaliates by slashing Shaka's back. Shaka manages to stab Wallace's waist, forcing him to stumble back. Shaka charges at Wallace, but he regains his balance at the last second and impales Shaka on his claymore as he jumps in attack. Wallace throws Shaka's dead body aside and yells victoriously.

Winner: William Wallace

== Episode 9: I.R.A. vs. Taliban ==
I.R.A. team: Skoti Collins (I.R.A. descendant/historian), Peter Crowe (I.R.A. weapons expert)
I.R.A. weapons: Slingshot, LPO-50 flamethrower, ArmaLite AR-15, nail bomb
I.R.A. armor: None
I.R.A. statistics: Height: 5 feet 11 inches, Weight: 180 pounds, Armor: None, Gear: 30 pounds

Taliban team: Fahim Fazli (Mujahideen Freedom Fighter), Alex Sami (Counter-Terrorism Specialist)
Taliban weapons: Bayonet, RPG-7 rocket launcher, AK-47 assault rifle, PMN mine
Taliban armor: None
Taliban statistics: Height: 5 feet 9 inches, Weight: 160 pounds, Armor: None, Gear: 20 pounds

Results
	I.R.A.	Kills	Taliban	Kills
Short-range weapons	Slingshot	2	Bayonet	35
Mid-range weapons	LPO-50 flamethrower	70	RPG-7 rocket launcher	162
Long-range weapons	AR-15 Armalite	315	AK-47 assault rifle	245
Special weapons	Nail bomb	130	PMN mine	41
Totals		517		483

- For short-range weapons, the Taliban's bayonet proved more deadly than the I.R.A.'s slingshot. The slingshot was a very accurate weapon (capable of hitting the eye socket of a skull), and its velocity was clocked at roughly 155 mph, but it did not provide sufficient killing power. The bayonet was declared the winner because it turned the already powerful AK-47 into a short range spear, ripping a reinforced cloth punching bag in half with repeated strikes, and puncturing a gel torso's heart and lung.
- For mid-range weapons, the LPO-50 flamethrower was paired against the RPG-7 rocket launcher. The LPO-50 (or rather, since the LPO-50 is banned in the US, a substitute flamethrower) burnt its targets at temperatures of 1500 degrees Fahrenheit. However, the effective range (920 meters), explosion radius, and killing power of the RPG-7 were unquestionable, giving it the edge in mid-range weapons.
- For long-range weapons, the I.R.A.'s AR-15 was tested against the Taliban's AK-47. The AR-15 was capable of hitting a smaller target, meaning it was more accurate. The AK-47 was the victor of a reliability test involving mud, but the footage revealed that both rifles had been safetied. Geoff decided to take the assault rifles into his own hands to decide. In his test, Geoff liked the AR-15 better, earning it the win.
- For special weapons, the IRA's nail bomb was compared to the PMN mine. The nail bomb managed to take out all of its targets by lodging its nails into them. The PMN mine proved to be powerful enough to dismember limbs, but could only kill two of its five targets. The nail bomb was more effective at lethally damaging multiple targets, giving the edge over the PMN mine.
- This is the first squad-on-squad battle on the show where a counter to tell how many men are remaining on each side was used.
- The Taliban were the only warriors in the final battle to be killed with their own weapons (other than in suicide). One was killed by friendly fire with the RPG-7, and another was killed with his own bayonet after losing it in a struggle with the I.R.A. leader.
- This is the closest match-up of season 1, as well as the closest match-up with the original simulator.
- The I.R.A. are the first of two warriors to get the edge in explosive weapons and win (The other is the US Army Rangers).
- According to the listed statistics, the I.R.A. had a size advantage of 2 inches and 20 lbs. The Taliban has a gear difference of 10 lbs.

=== Reenactment 9 ===
The battle starts with five Taliban militia climbing over a small hill leading to an abandoned car lot. They survey the area for potential targets. Meanwhile, an I.R.A. squad is sneaking through the lot, using the cars as cover. The I.R.A. leader leads his four men through the lot, but wind up running into the Taliban. Both sides manage to get off one kill with each of their assault rifles, the AK-47 and the AR-15 Armalite. Both teams scramble and run off in different directions. A Taliban member runs from an I.R.A. man in between two cars. As the I.R.A. man begins to catch up, he steps on a PMN mine and is killed by the explosion. The Taliban soldier escapes, but runs into an I.R.A. member wielding an LPO-50 Flamethrower. He is set on fire and desperately tries to shoot in random directions, but dies before he can make a hit. Another Taliban member runs up and shoots the flamethrower's gas tank, causing it to explode and kill the I.R.A. soldier. Another I.R.A. man runs in between the cars, but is spotted by a Taliban member. He pulls out his RPG-7 Rocket Launcher and fires a rocket at the I.R.A. man, killing him. The I.R.A. leader slowly enters a run-down trailer, keeping an eye out for the Taliban. He opens a closet door and sees a hand holding an AK-47. He quickly moves to avoid the gunfire, and then pulls out the Taliban boss from the closet. The two get into a fight, with the Taliban boss throwing the I.R.A. leader against the cupboards. Outside, the Taliban member with the rocket launcher sees the two men and prepares another rocket. The I.R.A. leader pushes the Taliban boss against the wall and knocks him to the floor, then looks out the window just in time to see the Taliban member with the RPG-7 pointed right at the trailer. He quickly runs out of the trailer, leaving the Taliban boss inside. The Taliban member outside fires the rocket, unaware that the I.R.A. leader left without the Taliban boss. The Taliban boss gets up and sees the rocket flying towards the trailer, leaving only enough time to scream in terror before the trailer explodes. The other Taliban member pulls a bayonet off his AK-47 and runs after the I.R.A. leader. The I.R.A. leader turns and fires his slingshot, but misses. The Taliban man catches up and tries to stab him, but the I.R.A. leader swings a car door in his face. The two struggle to gain control of the bayonet and the I.R.A. leader gains the upper hand, stabbing the Taliban man in the throat. A final Taliban member rushes in with his own AK-47 and tries to shoot the I.R.A. leader. He picks up an Armalite from a fallen I.R.A. man and runs from the Taliban member, trying to shoot him as well. The chase leads to a broken-down bus. The I.R.A. leader runs into the bus and pulls out a nail bomb. He sticks it next to the exit in the back and gets out. As the Taliban member enters the bus, the I.R.A. leader blocks the exit with the Armalite. The Taliban member tries to open the door, but is unable to do so. The I.R.A. leader begins taunting him with the remote and then runs away. The Taliban member sees the bomb and tries harder to open the door. The I.R.A. leader runs to a safe spot, then presses a button on the remote. The bomb begins beeping, then explodes and kills the last Taliban member. The I.R.A. leader raises his fist and yells "Éire!" (Ireland) in victory.

Winner: I.R.A.

== Back for Blood special ==
As a transition from season one to season two, a special episode (titled Back for Blood) was aired to pit the winning warriors from season one against one another. It was decided to make a distinction between ancient and modern warriors due to the advent of gunpowder changing the face of warfare.

=== Ancient match ===
For the ancient elimination block, the warriors assembled included the Apache, Samurai, Spartan, Shaolin Monk, and William Wallace. The Shaolin Monk was automatically removed from the running due to being passive and for his lack of armor. William Wallace was eliminated due to a lack of a formidable long range weaponry, as well as his easily penetrable chainmail. The Apache was taken out for his lack of armor and armor-penetrating weapons. They decided on the Spartan and Samurai, the team captains of the remaining teams made a return to retest their weapons against different adversaries.

Spartan representative: Barry Jacobsen (Spartan Historian)
Spartan weapons: Short sword, spear, javelin, shield

Samurai representative: Tetsuro Shigematsu (Samurai descendant)
Samurai weapons: katana, naginata, yumi, Kanabo

Ancient Match Results
	Spartan	Kills	Samurai	Kills
Short-range weapons	Short sword	10	katana	15
Mid-range weapons	Spear	339	Naginata	141
Long-range weapons	Javelin	16	Yumi	175
Special weapons	Shield	162	Kanabo	142
Totals		527		473

- For short-range weapons, the Samurai katana was tested against the Spartan's short sword, the xiphos. Footage of the tests for both from previous episodes was reviewed. The edge was given to the katana for slicing through two pigs, while the xiphos did not even go through one. The katana also had a length advantage over the xiphos.
- For mid-range weapons, the Samurai's naginata was pitted against a gel torso wearing a Spartan cuirass. The gel torso was mounted on an "attack bot" to simulate an attacking Spartan. The naginata failed to penetrate its target, inflicting a dent on the Spartan cuirass but not even inflicting enough blunt force trauma to break a rib. The same attack bot was then outfitted with a Samurai cuirass and tested against the Spartan's dory spear, which not only failed to penetrate its target, but was also severely bent in the process. The dory spear managed to chip the outermost layer of lacquer on the samurai do, but like the naginata, it failed to generate enough blunt force trauma to break a bone behind the do. Despite this, the weapons were declared even because neither could penetrate their enemy's armor.
- For long-range weapons, both teams reviewed the footage of the Spartan's javelin and the Samurai's yumi. The javelin was deemed a weapon used against mass formations instead of a single enemy, while the yumi had speed, killing power, and accuracy. The yumi was unanimously (including the Spartan expert) given the edge because of its high speed and lethal accuracy.
- For special weapons, the kanabo and the Spartan shield were pitted against each other. While the kanabo used in the testing did fair structural damage to the Viking shield earlier on in season one, the Spartan shield was too solid for the kanabo to damage and was unharmed except for a few dents. The impact of the kanabo onto the Spartan shield was measured at roughly 425 psi (2,930 kPa) (roughly 50 psi less than it generated against the Viking shield). The Spartan shield was shown to be just as powerful a weapon as ever and therefore given the edge.
- Despite only testing one weapon (the yumi) in the original episode, Shigematsu was chosen to test all three other Samurai weapons, instead of the more physically imposing Chan. In addition to not being the trained expert, the weapon's strength based nature would have skewed the results against the Samurai. This was especially evident in the Kanabo tests where significantly less force were recorded.
- This is the third episode to have a tie in weapons edges.
- According to the statistics listed in their regular season matchups, the Spartan had a significant size advantage of 5 inches and 30 lbs. The Spartan also had gear which was 5 pounds lighter.

==== Ancient match reenactment ====
The battle begins with the Samurai walking through a forest with his naginata and yumi Bow in his hands. As he is walking, the Spartan emerges from behind a giant rock and eyes the Samurai. The Samurai, sensing danger, thrusts his naginata into the ground and watches the Spartan. The Spartan grunts and holds out his Javelin, ready for battle. The Samurai takes an arrow and fires at the Spartan. The Spartan jumps down from the rock and towards the Samurai, knocking the arrow away with his Spartan Shield. He throws the Javelin at the Samurai, but aims too high and misses completely. The Samurai readies another arrow while the Spartan pulls out his Spear and charges at the Samurai. At the last second, the Samurai aims for the Spartan's legs and shoots, but it goes in between them and hits the floor. The Spartan tries to hit the Samurai with his Spear, but the Samurai dodges and picks up his naginata.

The two begin swinging at each other until the Samurai hits his shield. The Spartan uses the Shield as a wall and shoves the Samurai all the way up to a tree. The Samurai tries to stab the Spartan with the naginata, but the Spartan parries with his Spear and breaks the naginata in two with his Shield. The Samurai, undeterred, grabs the Spartan's Spear and flips over the Spartan, causing him to release the Spear. The Samurai throws it away and pulls out his Kanabo club. He starts to viciously swing at the Spartan, but the Spartan uses his shield to cover his body and block the blows. The Samurai stops briefly to regain his strength, but the Spartan draws his short sword and stabs the Samurai's ear. The Samurai shrieks in pain, backs away and checks his ear for blood. Meanwhile, the Spartan, now very angry, gets back up and starts advancing towards the Samurai.

The two stop in the middle of a field while the Samurai grabs a hold of the handle of his katana. The Spartan makes his move first and thrusts the short sword at the Samurai, but the Samurai dodges and swings his katana. The Spartan, however, blocks it with his Shield and shoves the Samurai away. The two stand off again, and the Spartan once again tries to stab the Samurai. The Samurai avoids it and again tries to hit the Spartan, but the Spartan blocks and hits the Samurai with his Shield. The Samurai gets up and readies himself and his katana. The Samurai makes a quick thrust at the Spartan in an attempt to finish him off. The Spartan, however, effortlessly blocks again with the Shield and thrusts his short sword. It cuts into the Samurai's stomach and leaves him frozen in place. The Spartan swings the Shield into the Samurai's face and knocks him to the ground. The Spartan walks up to him and thrusts the short sword into the Samurai's neck, killing him. He pulls out the sword and watches as blood spurts from the Samurai's neck. He raises his short sword in the air and roars in victory.

Ancient winner: Spartan

=== Modern match ===
The modern elimination block included the Pirate, Mafia, Spetznaz, and IRA. The Pirate was automatically eliminated due to his weapons being deemed too "primitive" in comparison to his modern counterparts particularly when Geoff compared the Pirate's Flintlock pistol and Blunderbuss to the IRA's AR-15. Even though they had the .45 caliber Thompson submachine gun and the Sawn-off shotgun, the Mafia was eliminated from contention due to the group not being "professionals", as well as much of their weaponry being improvised. Armand also mentioned that while a Baseball bat can cause trauma, it's useless when there's bullets flying around. The Spetsnaz were chosen hands down as the most disciplined warrior of the modern era, while the IRA was deemed the most "unpredictable" of the group, however Geoff pointed out that the IRA only used weapons they had available as opposed to the right tool for the job and Max added that weapons acquired from the black market are sometimes known for being unreliable. Due to the weapon disadvantage, two more IRA weapons were tested to pair up against two existing Spetznaz weapons. Coincidentally the 2 chosen warriors, IRA and Spetsnaz, were also the most modern since the Pirate was during the golden age of piracy (1700s) and the Mafia was during the Prohibition era (1920s).

IRA representative: Skoti Collins (IRA Descendant/Historian)
IRA weapons: Webley Revolver, LPO-50 Flamethrower, AR-15 Armalite, HK G3 Sniper Rifle, Nail Bomb, Slingshot

Spetsnaz representative: Sonny Puzikas (Former Spetsnaz Operative)
Spetsnaz weapons: Makarov pistol, Saiga shotgun, AK74 Carbine, Dragunov Rifle, RGD-5 grenade, Ballistic Knife

Modern match results
	IRA	Kills	Spetsnaz	Kills
Short-range weapons	Webley Revolver	8	Makarov pistol	20
Mid-range weapons	LPO-50 Flamethrower	11	Saiga shotgun	92
Long-range automatic weapons	AR-15 Armalite	175	AK74 Carbine	472
Long-range sniper weapons	HK G3 Sniper Rifle	47	Dragunov Rifle	120
Explosive Weapons	Nail Bomb	20	RGD-5 grenade	7
Special Weapons	Slingshot	3	Ballistic knife	6
Totals		264		736

- For short range weapons, the Makarov was pitted against the IRA's side arm, the Webley Revolver. Despite the Webley being a more powerful pistol, the Makarov was given the advantage due to the pistol carrying more ammo than the six bullets in the Webley and can be reloaded faster.
- For mid range weaponry, footage for season one reviewed the IRA's LPO-50 Flamethrower against the Spetsnaz's Saiga shotgun. While the Saiga was quick and deadly, the LPO-50 Flamethrower brought a psychological advantage. Additionally, burn injuries were deemed to be far worse than gunshot wounds, giving the IRA the edge.
- For long range automatic rifles, the footage of season one was reviewed for the AR-15 Armalite and AK-74 Carbine. It was agreed that the Armalite was the more accurate weapon, but the AK-74 was the more durable weapon; hence, the result was a draw.
- For long range sniper rifles, the IRA's HK G3 was paired against the Dragunov. While both weapons had high kill ratios, the Dragonov was deemed faster and more accurate in terms of execution and given the edge.
- For special weapons, season one footage reviewed the IRA's sling shot and Spetsnaz's ballistic knife. The ballistic knife was determined as having the advantage due to the weapon's killing power.
- For explosives, the nail bomb and RGD-5 grenade were reviewed from the season one footage. While the RGD-5 was powerful at a wide range, the Nail Bomb (despite being an improvised weapon) was given the advantage due to the high killing power of its shrapnel.
- This is the fourth episode to have a tie in weapons edges and is also the only episode with the original simulator to have a warrior with kills in the 700s.
- This match is the most lop-sided match in the show's history with a difference of 472 kills.
- This is the first episode where only one side didn't bring one of their weapons in the final battle. (The IRA did not use the slingshot)
- The Spetsnaz is the fourth of thirteen warriors to win after scoring more kills at mid range and long range.
- The LPO-50 Flamethrower is the fourth weapon to be given the edge while scoring fewer kills than the opposing weapon.
- According to the information listed in their regular season matchups, the IRA had a negligible weight advantage of 5 lbs, with heights being equal. While the statistics list Spetznaz as having lighter gear by 3 pounds, this was most likely increased by the extra weaponry given to the IRA for this episode. No force size statistic was given for the IRA.
- There are 19 Spetsnaz kills unaccounted for. When adding the amount of Spatsnaz kills, the total is only 717, not 736 as shown on the episode.

==== Modern match reenactment ====
Five Spetsnaz soldiers infiltrate a warehouse serving as the IRA's headquarters. On top of the building, an IRA sniper spots them and downs one of the Spetsnaz with his HK G3 sniper rifle. Inside, an IRA member constructing a nail bomb hears the gunshot and realizes that there are intruders. The IRA sniper fires at another Spetsnaz soldier, who runs behind a tree and avoids the shot. The four IRA members inside seize weapons and look for cover. The IRA sniper tries to shoot the Spetsnaz man behind the tree, but misses again. A Spetsnaz sniper sets up his Dragunov sniper rifle. He shoots, killing the gunman and knocking him off the rooftop. He signals to the others that it is now clear to enter the building.

One of them opens the door and is met with gunfire from two AR-15 Armalites. He fires back with his AK74 carbine and ducks for cover behind drum barrels inside the door. Another Spetsnaz soldier gives him covering fire from the entrance. The Spetsnaz man on point shoots upward, engaging an IRA man who tries to shoot back, but his Armalite malfunctions. Now without a gun, he calls for the other IRA man with him to make a run for it. The leading Spetsnaz soldier calls for his team to pursue the IRA. As the two IRA men run a Spetsnaz RGD-5 grenade explodes and kills one of them. The other manages to escape. Two Spetsnaz soldiers run after him. They stop to shoot, not realizing there is an armed nail bomb right behind them. The IRA man is hit, but stays on his feet. He detonates the nail bomb with a remote control, killing one of the Spetsnaz soldiers.

The other follows the IRA man's blood trail. He enters another building, AK74 at the ready. As he turns a corner, the IRA man jumps him, knocks the gun out of the Spetsnaz's hands and throws him against a pillar. The IRA man tries to punch him in the face, but the Spetsnaz soldier elbows him in the side and applies a choke hold. He throws the IRA man to the floor and brings out his ballistic knife. The IRA man grabs his arm but is overpowered and stabbed in the face.

The Spetsnaz man gets up, only to see a stream of fire shoot from the corner. He backs away in the face of an IRA member advancing with an LPO-50 flamethrower. The Spetsnaz soldier runs into a nearby a room. It is a dead end. The IRA man sets fire to the entire room from the entrance, burning the Spetsnaz soldier to death. He nods in satisfaction and turns, to find a Saiga shotgun levelled at him. Terrified, the IRA man tries to bring his flamethrower to bear, but the Spetsnaz soldier is quicker and blows off his head.

The Spetsnaz soldier makes his way to a lavatory and cautiously opens the door. He slowly enters with the Spetsnaz leader following behind. Suddenly, the last IRA member jumps out and kills the Spetsnaz leader's last soldier with his Webley revolver. The Spetsnaz leader returns fire with his Makarov pistol, but misses. The IRA member takes cover and fires back but misses as well. He runs over to the toilets, dodging gunfire. He takes aim and tries to fire again. A click – he is out of ammunition. The Spetsnaz leader immediately charges. The IRA member desperately pulls the trigger again, but the Spetsnaz leader closes, shoves the Makarov against his throat and fires. Blood sprays the wall as the IRA member slumps onto the toilet seat. The Spetsnaz leader yells out "Ya Spetsnaz!" ("I am Spetsnaz") in victory.

Modern winner: Spetsnaz

== See also ==
- Death Battle
