= Battleboarding =

Type of online activity

Deadliest Fiction, one of the oldest and most well-known battleboarding sites today.

Battleboarding, also known as versus debating and "who would win" debating, is an activity that involves discussing and debating around hypothetical fights between individuals; most popularly, fictional characters. These debates are often held in forums, blogs, sites and wikis, known as versus sites or battle boards. Netizens who engage in battleboarding online are often called "battleboarders".

The earliest iterations of battleboarding first appeared in various online boards and forums, though its origins can be traced back to magazines, television shows, and comic book letter columns. Eventually, the online activity grew, becoming one of the most popular internet activities today, and spawning many online communities dedicated solely for battleboarding. It soon evolved into its own subculture, and even went on to inspire other media.

== History ==
=== Origins ===
Before the advent of the internet, articles about hypothetical fights were published in magazines. These articles range from topics like sports, comics and anime, such as Black Belt Magazine issue May 1997 which discussed about a hypothetical match between Muhammad Ali and Bruce Lee, and Wizard Magazine #133 which discussed about various hypothetical fights between American comic characters against Japanese anime characters. During that time, many comic book publishers also conceptualized and published "versus" storylines like Batman Versus Predator and Justice League/Avengers. Many films also capitalized on the concept of characters from different franchises fighting each other, such as Frankenstein Meets the Wolf Man (1943), King Kong vs. Godzilla (1962), Freddy vs Jason (2003), and Alien vs. Predator (2004).

Another inspiration behind battleboarding were television shows and documentaries whose premise involved hypothetical fights concerning a variety of subjects like zoology, paleontology, and military history. These include shows such as Animal Face-Off (which pitted animals against each other), Deadliest Warrior (which pitted historical warriors, oftentimes from different time periods, against each other), and Jurassic Fight Club (which was about analyzing cases where different types of dinosaurs fought one another). Death Battle, a web series about pitting characters against each other that began in 2010, is a similar show that soon inspired many battleboarding communities and fandoms. Death Battle, as with many other battleboarding series and websites before it, utilised "calcs", which are mathematical equations that try to calculate how strong a character or weapon is. Other popular web series about the subject include Super Power Beat Down and Grudge Match.

=== Forums and sites ===
Many internet forums about movies, comics, anime, and video games often held discussions about hypothetical fights between characters from these media. These discussions would be the first iteration of online battleboarding. A notable early battleboarding website was stardestroyer.net (founded 1998), created by Michael Wong. The website focuses in large part on match-ups between the Star Wars and Star Trek franchises, and also includes a forum covering this as well as other more general battleboarding topics, usually related to science fiction and space opera. In addition to the forums, several webpages written by the administrators and contributors were embedded on the site. These attempted to mathematically quantify the capabilities of Star Wars technology and prove their superiority to their Star Trek equivalents, such as Wong's "Star Wars vs Star Trek: Technology Overview" and Brian Young's "Turbolaser Commentaries."

stardestroyer.net had a notable impact on early battleboarding culture and also influenced official products. Curtis Saxton, author of several officially-licensed Star Wars technical reference books, thanked Wong, Young, and several other stardestroyer.net contributors by name in the acknowledgements section of Star Wars: Attack of the Clones Incredible Cross-Sections (2002), referring to them as "prominent among the hundreds of people contributing to constructive debates about Star Wars technicalities over the years, resulting in the consensus of conceptual and physical foundations applied in these pages." Saxton's books in the Incredible Cross-Sections series contain specific numbers about the capabilities of Star Wars ships original to these publications and not used in any other official sources. In an interview conducted by TheForce.Net, Saxton claimed to have been offered the job of writing reference books by a DK employee familiar with his "Star Wars Technical Commentaries" webpage (1995–2001), where Saxton attempted to calculate the firepower, speed, and durability of Star Wars spaceships using his background as an astrophysics student.

One of the oldest and longest-running battleboarding forum is Comic Vine's "battle forum", whose first post was in 2007. Comic Vine also has one of the largest impacts on battleboarding, creating many common rules and terminologies such as "bloodlusted", "morals are off", "speed equalized", and many others. Another long-running battle forum is a subreddit called r/whowouldwin, where redditors can post and debate fights about real or fictional individuals. Verdicts of these match-ups are often chosen by using evidences of a character's power, weakness, or feat, such as movie clips, comic book panel scans, and excerpts from related literature; all of which are posted and categorized in a separate subreddit called r/respectthreads. Other influential battle forums include Fanverse, where users can post their own calcs about a character's power level.

The popularity of battle forums inspired the creation of websites dedicated only for battleboarding. These include The Outskirts Battle Dome, a website that popularized the use of "power levels" in battleboarding; the aforementioned stardestroyer.net; and Space Battles, a website whose forums and threads are filled with posts about hypothetical fights between characters as well as other related topics. Another influential battleboarding site is the now defunct Fact Pile, and its sister site, FactPileTopia. Fact Pile is one of the first battleboarding site that actually listed down and documented winners of their match-ups. The site closed down in 2016 along with its forum, wikia, and YouTube channel. Besides these, blogs about battleboarding were also created, such as dreager1.com.

=== Wikis ===
Nowadays, the most popular battleboarding communities can be seen in Fandom, with two of the oldest and most popular being Deadliest Fiction and VS Battles Wiki.

Deadliest Fiction is a Deadliest Warrior-inspired fanon created in July 2010 by a group of historians, academics, and pop culture enthusiasts. Being one of the most influential and accurate battleboarding sites around, Deadliest Fiction allows users to create hypothetical match-ups in the form of blogs, where other users can vote and debate around who will win in the comment section. Once a verdict is reached, the site allows the user to create a simulated fanfiction of how the fight would happen.

The same year in October, a similar battleboarding site named VS Battles Wiki was created. In the VS Battles Wiki, users can create profiles and power levels of characters, post match-ups in its threads and forums, and list down the winners and losers of these threads in said character profiles. The wiki is considered the most active wiki battleboarding site today, with over 1 million visitors per month. However, throughout the years, the VS Battles Wiki has had its share of controversies, such as alleged inaccuracies in its profiles.

There have also been websites and fanfiction wikis inspired by the battleboarding internet show Death Battle. These include the long-running G1 Death Battle Fan Blog, r/deathbattlematchups, and the popular Death Battle Fanon Wiki and DBX Fanon Wiki. Death Battle also released its own dice and card game, complete with rules and effects taken from battleboarding.

== Subculture ==
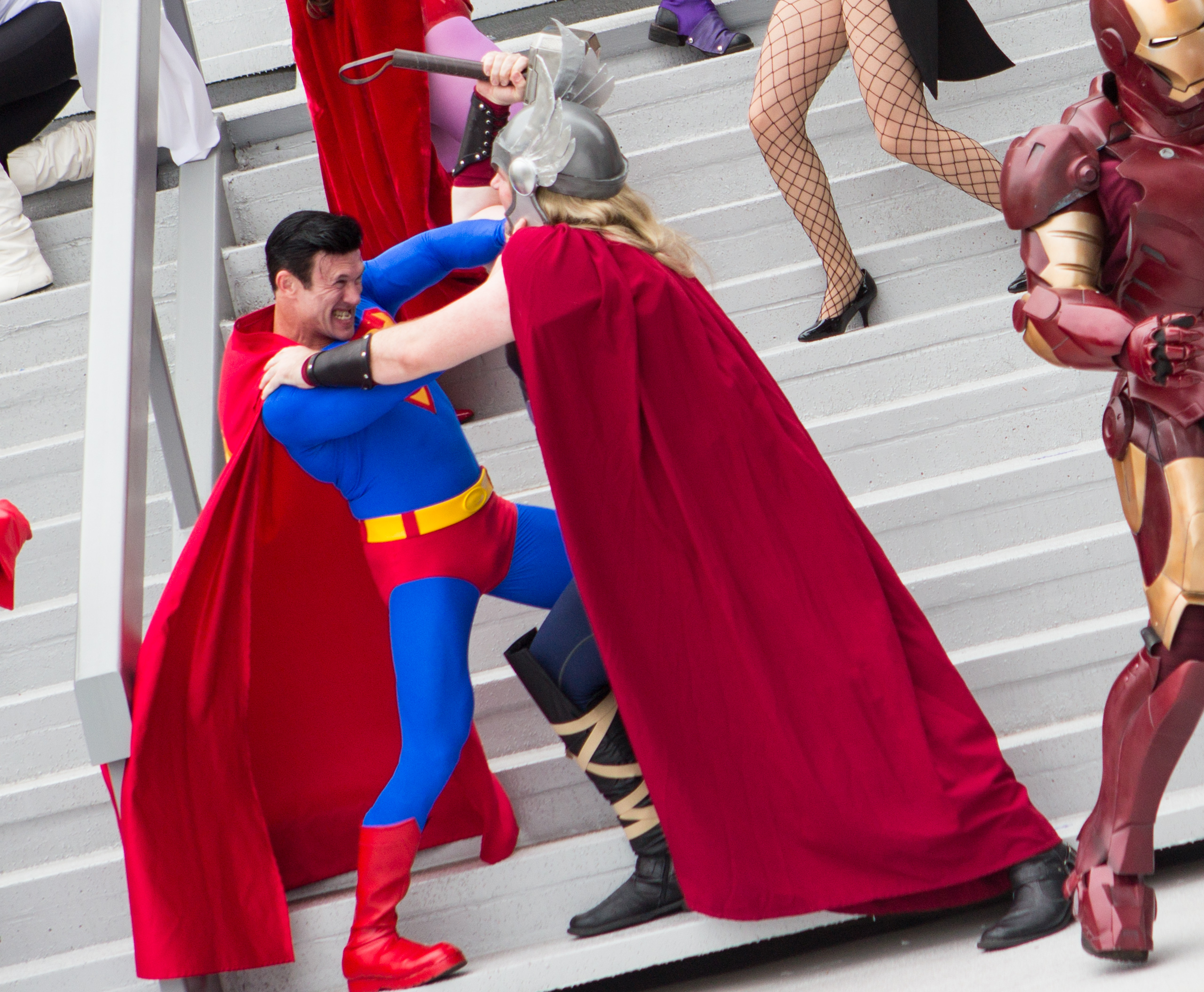
Cosplayers depicting a fight between Superman of DC Comics and Thor of Marvel Comics.

In its rise in popularity, battleboarding has given birth to a unique online subculture with its own rules, activities, and terminologies. Several of these influences have become present in other online communities and popular media. Some of the common slang and terminologies used in battleboarding subculture includes:

- Battle Field Removal: Often abbreviated to "BFR", this is a rule that a fight can end if one character is taken out of a battlefield. This rule is used for characters who have the powers to teleport or transport enemies without actually killing them.
- Battle Royale: A term originating from Comic Vine in which multiple characters are pitted against each other. The name is probably derived from the film Battle Royale or the video game genre of the same name.
- Bloodlusted: A hypothetical situation wherein the characters are pitted against each other while in a furious, berserker-like state.
- Calc: These are calculations battleboarders use to determine how strong a character is, or their powers or weapons.
- Composite: A term originating from r/whowouldwin that denotes a version of a character that contains all of their feats across different versions or alliterations. This version is mostly created by battleboarders and sometimes tends to be disregarded as original characters.
- Diff: A term that refers to how difficult it would be for one character to defeat another. For instance, “high-diff” implies that a significant amount of effort would be required for a particular character to attain victory against their opponent.
- Feat: An accomplishment that a certain character has done using their powers, weapons, or other ability during combat.
- Hax: A term used to denote powers, moves, or attacks that can affect or damage an enemy even if said enemy is durable or invincible.
- Lowballing/Downplaying: A term that refers to an error in which battleboarders exaggerate how weak a character is.
- Morals Off: A hypothetical situation wherein the characters are pitted against each other while disregarding whatever good moral compass they have.
- Power Level: Also known as "tiers", this refers to categorizing different characters in terms of how powerful they are.
- Power Scaling: A term used in battleboarding that refers to creating an artificial stat or feat for a character by analyzing another character they have proven at least comparable to in canon.
- Prep: A hypothetical situation wherein the characters being pitted against each other are given some time to prepare for the fight.
- Respect Thread: Forum posts or articles that contain all of the scans and feats of a character.
- Scan: Screenshots or scanned pictures that battleboarders use as proof of a feat.
- Solo: A term where powerful character can instantly defeat another character.
- Speed Blitz: Taken from the German word "blitz" and popularized by the World War II strategy "Blitzkrieg". Like its namesake, speed blitz is a term used for choosing a winner because they are too fast for their opponent to be able to effectively react. Essentially, it is making a verdict on a match-up due to advantages in speed.
- Speed Equalized: A hypothetical situation wherein the characters are pitted against each other while disregarding any advantages they have in terms of speed (unless they are a speedster). This situation was born out of the observation that most characters have inconsistent speeds and can theoretically fight at whatever optimal speed the people choose them to be in.
- Stomp: A description used for the result of an unfair match-up in which one character has no means of winning the fight, with the act of "stomping" referring to a character winning such a match-up.
- Standard Battlefield Assumption (SBA): A term used when people pit two characters against each other without any added rule or situation. This generally means that the fight starts with the characters meeting each other for the first time, without any prior knowledge of each other, and starting off at a relatively medium distance while in their base forms.
- Tank: A term used for when a character is durable enough to withstand attacks from enemies. The term is taken from the war vehicle of the same name.
- Wanking/Glazing: A term that refers to an error in which battleboarders exaggerate how strong a character is, usually by overcomplicating a certain feat or abusing power scaling.
- X-Factor: A term originating from Deadliest Warrior and Deadliest Fiction. X-factors are essential stats in a character that cannot be quantified like other stats such as strength or speed. Instead, x-factors are about comparing characteristics like experience, brutality, calmness, and logistics between each character.

== In other media ==
Battleboarding has gone on to inspire other media with its subculture and terminologies. Many web series such as "Ultimate Showdown of Ultimate Destiny", Seth The Programmer, and Jobbers and Goons were inspired by it. Internet personality Rainey Ovalle created a viral skit posted in Twitter that parodied battleboarding. In the skit, he and a friend debated a fight between Deku from My Hero Academia and Saitama from One-Punch Man, with the argument getting increasingly and humorously intense. Invincible creator Robert Kirkman once participated in a similar debate concerning his character, Mark Grayson, against other famous comic book characters like Superman and Thanos.

BuzzFeed also has a category in their website concerning "Who Would Win In A Fight" debates. According to video game developer Nick Antonis, the company Naxeex took inspiration for their superhero sandbox games from battleboarding shows and sites such as Death Battle and the VS Battles Wiki. Antonis stated, "You can always count on them to be updated on new series and characters. Actually, a lot of our games, stories, and characters were inspired by these websites." Deadliest Fiction has also been mentioned or referenced in various historical and pop culture researches, including books by Karen A. Ritzenhoff and Jacob Rene Huntington.
