= Deadliest Warrior =

American documentary TV series (2009-2011)

- Deadliest Warrior title screen
- Genre: Documentary
- Created by: Gary Tarpinian; Tim Prokop
- Directed by: Tim Prokop (pilot/season 1); F. Paul Benz (season 1)
- Starring: Geoff Desmoulin; Armand Dorian; Max Geiger (2009–2010); Richard Machowicz (2011); Robert Daly (2011)
- Narrated by: Drew Skye (Pseudonym; voiced by David Wenham)
- Composer: Michael Plowman
- Country of origin: United States
- No. of seasons: 3
- No. of episodes: 32 + 1 special (list of episodes)

Production
- Executive producers: Rasha Drachkovitch; Tim Warren; Sharon Levy; Tim Duffy
- Producer: Joshua E. Kessler
- Cinematography: Jim Orr; Bry Sanders
- Editors: Dan Holcchek; Duncan Sinclair; Chris Wright; Jimmy Miller (lead editor)
- Camera setup: Multiple-camera setup
- Running time: 44 minutes
- Production companies: Morningstar Entertainment (2009–2010); 44 Blue (2011); Spike Original

Original release
- Network: Spike
- Release: April 7, 2009 – September 14, 2011

Deadliest Warrior is an American television program in which information on historical or modern warriors and their weapons are used to determine which of them is the "deadliest" based upon tests performed during each episode. The show is characterized by its use of data compiled in creating a dramatization of the warriors' battle to the death. The show ran for three seasons, from 2009 to 2011.

== Development ==
The show was originally developed by Morningstar Entertainment, and later moved to production company 44 Blue. The showrunner for the first season was Tim Prokop. Tim Warren became the showrunner during the second season and continued with the show during its move to 44 Blue and the third season. The historical adviser in the first and second season and associate producer in the second season was Barry C. Jacobsen; who represented the Spartan Team in Season 1. He also worked with associate producer Ryo Okada on content preparation and warrior selection for the first two seasons.

== Format ==
Episodes begin with the introduction of either two types of historical or contemporary warriors or two historical individuals. The history, culture, and general fighting philosophies of each are explained. The explanations are accompanied by segments showing actors performing dramatized scenes that are meant to depict the daily lives of the actual fighters. Two teams of experts (of either the history or martial abilities of the warriors) are brought onto the show to test weapons spotlighted as being used by each of the warriors. Typically, the different weapons are organized into four categories (and as of season 3, three categories): short range, mid range, long range, and special weapons (usually absent in season 3). However, some episodes (for instance, "Green Berets vs. Spetsnaz") have had as many as six categories. Matt Anderson and Sonny Puzikas, the experts for the "Green Beret vs. Spetsnaz" episode, have suggested that the teams are assigned weapons by the producers and that they have little influence in the production of the acted simulations.

The teams test the assigned weapons on various targets including human silhouette targets, mannequins, pig and cattle carcasses, and ballistics gel torsos, heads, limbs, etc. Additionally, pressure mats, accelerometers, chronometers, and other measuring tools are used to test such figures as the striking force and speed of each weapon. Sometimes, the targets are covered with armor that is representative of what would be worn by the warrior's opponent. While the damage inflicted on the armor by the weapon is factored into the weapon's effectiveness, the defensive ability of armor isn't included as a separate category on the show in the first two seasons (with the exception of Pirate vs. Knight). All of the weapon tests are recorded with high speed photography, and the results are fed into a computer that measures the damage each weapon is capable of inflicting. The producers and hosts then compare the results for each of the weapon categories and determine which weapon they feel will give its warrior an edge in that category during the simulation. However, the hosts of the show have admitted that their choice of which weapon gets the edge has no effect on the final results.

The data collected from the weapons tests is fed into a computer simulation based on unreleased software developed by Slitherine Software based on components from their game The History Channel Great Battles of Rome to determine the average winner of one thousand battles, and starting with season 3, a new system created by Pipeworks Software determines the winner based on five thousand battles. These results are then used to create a fictional battle reenactment (between two characters or two small groups) performed by actors. After the battle dramatization has ended, the number of killing blows (or effectiveness percentages in season 3) attained by each weapon during the computer simulations is revealed. Episodes conclude with the hosts and guests commenting on why they agree or disagree with the outcome of the match.

== Hosts ==
In its first two seasons, the show was hosted by three commentators: Geoff Desmoulin (biomedical scientist and high speed camera operator), Armand Dorian, (medical consultant), and Max Geiger (simulations programmer). All three provided commentary throughout the show, as well as technical details of each weapons test. The show is narrated by actor David Wenham, using the pseudonym "Drew Skye".

== Broadcast ==
=== Pilot ===
The pilot episode was Spartan vs Ninja. Shot in February 2008, the pilot was unique in not being staged in the "Fight Club" in Los Angeles; but instead at Bermite Properties in Santa Clarita, California. The reality scenes were directed by Tim Prokop who also wrote all of the outlines, treatments and shooting scripts. They were shot in 3 days, and the concept was one of the first to introduce high speed film techniques, visual effects, and biomechanical testing. The reality shoot - filmed with real weapons - was followed by a 3 day recreation shoot with fake weapons. This was directed by Tripp Reed (first unit) and Tim Prokop (2nd unit and VFX). The recreation script was also written by Tim Prokop. The Thermopylae and other Spartan reenactment scenes were shot near the Hollywood sign, at Bronson Caves in the Hollywood Hills. Since the budget was tight, Prokop enlisted the help of VFX Supervisor Ron Thornton and the students at DAVE School in Orlando Florida for the pilot visual effects. DAVE stands for Digital Animation and Visual Effects. The pilot became a graduate project that launched a school tradition for broadcast graduate projects that continues to this day. When focus tested in June 2008, the episode scored the highest marks in Spike's history; with a number that was only surpassed by the pilot Tim Prokop produced in 2009 - Crash Test. The Deadliest Warrior series was greenlit in October 2008. The pilot episode aired - with very minor changes - as the third episode in season 1.

=== Season 1 ===
The first season premiered on April 7, 2009 at 10 pm ET. Nine one-hour episodes of the show were produced for season 1. Season 1 was released on DVD and Blu-ray on May 11, 2010.

The series was originally slated to air 8 weeks later but another series failed to make deadlines and showrunner Tim Prokop was asked to move it up. Despite being a mammoth production, with multiple filming units, stunts, VFX, real-world testing, computer simulations, recreations and real weapons - the series met the new deadlines. The first season of Deadliest Warrior immediately marked it as the highest rated non-sports series in Spike's history.

=== Season 2 ===
The second season had 13 episodes which began airing on April 20, 2010, with the last episode airing on July 27, 2010.

=== Season 3 ===
The third season had 10 episodes, running from July 20, 2011 to September 14, ending with a two-episode finale. Unlike the first two seasons, which consisted primarily of one-on-one battles, every episode of season 3 had squad-on-squad fights. Geiger did not return for season 3. He was replaced by military software developer Robert Daly, who designed the new simulation program. However, it was discovered that he was being misleading about his military service, serving in intelligence and not a combat role. Former Navy SEAL Richard "Mack" Machowicz, who analyzes the history and strategy of the warriors, was added to demonstrate a warrior's perspective among the hosts. Dave Baker, veteran weapons maker since season one, was given his own segment in which he gives background information used to recreate the show's weapons.

== Reception ==
After three episodes, Deadliest Warrior averaged 1.7 million viewers. On July 7, 2009, the program (specifically the "IRA vs. Taliban" episode) was ridiculed during the first episode of You Have Been Watching, a British television review and panel game hosted by critic Charlie Brooker. The show was featured on You Have Been Watching, before its premiere in the UK on August 11, 2009, on Bravo. Bravo only aired eight episodes in the UK, with "IRA vs Taliban" omitted.

Writing for Variety, Brian Lowry described it as "90% filler" and that "it makes a Universal Studios stunt show look like Masterpiece Theatre."

=== Cancellation ===
As of January 2012, Geoff Desmoulin announced on his Twitter profile that Spike had canceled the series.

== Other media ==
=== Web series ===
==== Deadliest Warrior: the Aftermath ====
Starting with Spartan vs. Ninja, a web series on Spike.com was created. Produced in a roundtable format, and hosted by Kieron Elliot (of the William Wallace team), it serves as a liaison between those watching the show and its producers, hosts, and experts. During The Aftermath, the producers focus on a specific match-up, and debate the issues pertaining to the episode raised by viewers in internet forums. It was created to answer questions from viewers, address its perceived inconsistencies, and provide a commentary from contributors.

For the episode "U.S. Army Rangers vs. North Korean Special Operations Forces", The Aftermath was broadcast live on TV from the Aftermath Studios in Los Angeles. Hosted by Kieron Elliot, fans got a chance to vote online at dwlive.spike.com for who they thought was going to win the final battle at the end of the episode. Joining Elliot were show regulars Geoff Desmoulin, Armand Dorian, and Richard Machowicz to discuss the outcome of the episode. The segment also invited a special guest to talk about the show: retired Lieutenant Colonel Steve Russell who was a key player in the hunt and capture of Saddam Hussein. The same was done for the season finale of Gurkhas vs. French Foreign Legion/Vampires vs. Zombies, featuring Steve Niles and Matt Mogk in the later portion.

==== Deadliest Warrior: Armory ====
Starting with "Genghis Khan vs. Hannibal", another online web series started. The show goes more in-depth regarding one weapon for each warrior in the same category, giving its history, specifications, and answering questions regarding its use. Hosted by Kieron Elliot, the show features Dave Baker: weapons maker giving details on ancient bladed weapons that he recreated as armorer for the show, with Gary Harper (of the Teddy Roosevelt team) using his historian and armorer experiences to impart knowledge on the featured vintage or modern firearms.

=== Video games ===
A tower defense game titled Deadliest Warrior: Defend and Conquer was released on March 11, 2010 and was available for download on the iPhone and iPod Touch. It contains three campaigns where the player must defend against groups of attacking enemies by purchasing and positioning warriors from Season 1 (and later Season 2 with the update) who each have varying stats and weapons based on the battle data from the show. On 5/28/2017, it has been confirmed to no longer be located in the Apple app store.

==== Deadliest Warrior: The Game ====
Pipeworks Software announced at the Spike Video Game Awards on December 12, 2009 that they would be developing a downloadable game called Deadliest Warrior: The Game that will come out first for the Xbox 360, and later the PlayStation 3. The Apache, Knight, Ninja, Pirate, Samurai, Spartan, and Viking from season one are playable.

The Roman Centurion from season two is also playable, with more characters to be added as the series progressed. On December 11, 2010 it was announced during the Spike TV Video Game Awards that the first three DLC characters would be the Shaolin Monk, the Rajput, and the Zande.

==== Deadliest Warrior: Legends ====
On April 7, 2011, Spike Games announced a sequel to their downloadable home console fighting game, Deadliest Warrior: Legends. It was released on July 7, 2011 for Xbox Live Arcade, and on July 26, 2011 for the PlayStation Network. New to this game is the inclusion of a new mode called Generals, a Risk-like game which uses the new combat simulator from season 3 to pit two opposing warriors and their armies against each other using the X-factors that made them legends.

The characters that are included are Alexander the Great, Attila the Hun, Genghis Khan, Hannibal, Hernán Cortés, Shaka Zulu, Sun Tzu, Vlad the Impaler, and William Wallace, with Joan of Arc and host Mack available as downloadable content.

==== Deadliest Warrior: Ancient Combat ====
On September 26, 2011, Spike confirmed Deadliest Warrior: Ancient Combat, a compilation of Deadliest Warrior: The Game and Deadliest Warrior: Legends. It will be on one disc as opposed to digital download and will include additional content. It was scheduled to be released for the Xbox 360 and PlayStation 3 on December 6, 2011, but was postponed to January 10, 2012, and later to April 17, 2012.

==== Chivalry: Deadliest Warrior ====
Chivalry: Deadliest Warrior is a first-person team combat simulator where one group of players take control of a historical warrior class and try to defeat the opposing team, who is also representing another historical warrior class, with various close-range and long-range weapons. A playable demo of Chivalry: Deadliest Warrior was showcased at the PAX Prime 2013 Gaming Expo in Seattle which featured Samurai and Spartan as the first two playable warrior classes.

== See also ==
- Animal Face-Off
- Death Battle
- Deadliest Fiction - a battleboarding wiki site inspired by Deadliest Warrior.
