= Death Battle =

American web series

- Logo
- Genre: Battleboarding; Action comedy
- Created by: Ben Singer
- Showrunners: Ben Singer; Chad James
- Theme music composer: Brandon Yates
- Composers: Brandon Yates; Therewolf Media
- Country of origin: United States
- Original language: English
- No. of seasons: 10 (+ 3 years)
- No. of episodes: 212

Production
- Production companies: ScrewAttack (2010–2019); Rooster Teeth (2019–2024); Party Up Media (2024–present)

Original release
- Release: December 6, 2010 – present

Death Battle (stylized as DEATH BATTLE!) is an American animated web series about battleboarding. Originally published by the website ScrewAttack in 2010, the show has changed considerably over its history. It is the longest-running web series in the battleboarding genre, and has gained a cult following.

== Format ==
The show is narrated by fictional hosts named Wizard (usually shortened to Wiz) and Boomstick, respectively voiced by series creators Ben Singer and Chad James. These characters were originally disembodied voices, but as the show progressed they became animated characters. Wiz is a genius scientist who typically presents scientific information and mathematical calculations, while Boomstick is a street-smart redneck who discusses weapons, armor, and feats.

Each episode of Death Battle features a matchup between fictional characters from different media that have similar powers, skills, or backstories. The majority of each episode showcases background information about each character while analyzing their stats, arsenals, abilities and feats, and ends with a fully-animated battle scene that decides the winner of the matchup, taking into account the prior analysis. The show's formula is inspired by shows such as Animal Face-Off and Deadliest Warrior, but uses fictional characters in place of animals or historical warriors. Notable episodes of Death Battle include "Goku VS Superman", "Galactus VS Unicron", and "Gojo VS Makima".

Death Battle has featured multiple styles of animation across different episodes, including 2D pixel sprite art animations, 3D animations and 2D hand-drawn animation. The show's battles typically feature high levels of graphic violence.

=== Spin-off shows ===
Death Battle has had multiple spin-off series. ScrewAttack created the series Desk of Death Battle, which showcases pop-culture trivia that the ScrewAttack team found interesting while researching and writing the main show, presented by Death Battle supporting character Jocelyn the Intern, who is voiced by Lisa Foiles. Additionally, DBX is a spin-off series that, like Death Battle, features both 2D and 3D animated battles, but with winners decided by a poll among fans rather than through research and feats.

== History ==
=== ScrewAttack (2010–2019) ===
Death Battle debuted in 2010 as a web series published by the website ScrewAttack; Death Battle became ScrewAttack's most popular show. The website began to shift its focus towards the show, and in 2019 ScrewAttack rebranded to focus exclusively on Death Battle. The show was acquired by Rooster Teeth, and all of ScrewAttack's existing content was moved to the Rooster Teeth website. One of the most viewed Death Battle episodes on the original ScrewAttack website was the season 1 episode "Starscream VS Rainbow Dash".

=== Rooster Teeth (2019–2024) ===
Death Battle was published by Rooster Teeth from 2019 until 2024, at which point Rooster Teeth was shut down by its parent company, Warner Bros. Discovery. In 2020, Amazon Prime Video sponsored a promotional episode of Death Battle to advertise the second season of The Boys. Rooster Teeth created a spin-off card game based on the show, titled Death Battle: The Game.

=== Independent/Party Up Media (2024–present) ===
Following the closure of Rooster Teeth, fans of Death Battle speculated about the show's future, and the hashtag "#SaveDeathBattle" trended on Twitter. The rights to the show were acquired by series creators Ben Singer, Chad James, Austin Harper, and Sam Mitchell, making it an independent series. In July 2024, the staff of the show announced a Kickstarter campaign to fund future episodes. The campaign surpassed its original goal of $75,000 within the first twenty-one minutes of launching. The campaign ended on August 29, 2024, and raised a total of $740,000 from 7,836 backers.

== Episodes ==
Season	Episodes	Originally released	
Season	Episodes	First released	Last released
1	25 ^{†}	December 6, 2010	January 10, 2013
2	32 ^{†}	May 31, 2013	December 15, 2015
3	14	March 16, 2016	December 21, 2016
4	16	February 1, 2017	December 20, 2017
5	16	February 7, 2018	December 19, 2018
6	16	February 6, 2019	December 18, 2019
7	20 ^{†}	January 27, 2020	December 28, 2020
8	16	March 8, 2021	December 20, 2021
9	16 ^{†}	March 28, 2022	December 21, 2022
10	16	May 22, 2023	December 18, 2023
2024 episodes	4	October 6, 2024	December 8, 2024
2025 episodes	12	February 2, 2025	December 7, 2025
2026 episodes	12	February 8, 2026	TBA

^{†}: Plus bonus episode

=== Season 1 (2010–2013) ===
No. overall	No. in season	Title	Length	Winner	Original release date
1	1	"Boba Fett VS Samus Aran (2010)" (Note: Episodes with a year listed after the title indicate the matchup was reexamined in a later season.)	6:56	Samus Aran	December 6, 2010
2	2	"Akuma VS Shang Tsung"	8:04	Akuma	December 21, 2010
3	3	"Rogue VS Wonder Woman"	6:31	Rogue	January 3, 2011
4	4	"Goomba VS Koopa Troopa"	7:01	Draw (Note: On a 2025 episode of their weekly podcast Death Battle Cast titled "Death Battle episodes we got WRONG?" these episodes were brought up as having different verdicts under modern standards, either due to the updated research on the Death Battle team or subsequent material after the episode aired that gave the loser an edge over the winner.)	January 17, 2011
5	5	"Mike Haggar VS Zangief"	7:15	Zangief	January 31, 2011
6	6	"Teenage Mutant Ninja Turtles Battle Royale (Leonardo VS Donatello VS Michelangelo VS Raphael)"	8:44	Leonardo	February 15, 2011
7	7	"Zitz VS Leonardo"	5:47	Leonardo	February 28, 2011
8	8	"Yoshi VS Riptor"	6:38	Yoshi	March 14, 2011
9	9	"Felicia VS Taokaka"	7:16	Taokaka	March 29, 2011
10	10	"Kratos VS Spawn"	8:39	Spawn	April 11, 2011
11	11	"Bomberman VS Dig Dug"	7:05	Dig Dug	April 25, 2011
12	12	"Vegeta VS Shadow"	9:02	Vegeta	May 9, 2011
13	13	"Mario VS Sonic (2011)"	9:39	Sonic	June 13, 2011
14	14	"Justin Bieber VS Rebecca Black"	7:46	Draw	July 11, 2011
14.5	14.5	"DEATH BATTLE! vs The World" (Note: This bonus episode was an advertisement for a t-shirt.)	2:41	Death Battle t-shirt	July 27, 2011
15	15	"Luke Skywalker VS Harry Potter"	7:54	Luke Skywalker	August 11, 2011
16	16	"Chun-Li VS Mai Shiranui"	6:56	Mai Shiranui	August 30, 2011
17	17	"Starscream VS Rainbow Dash"	9:32	Rainbow Dash	September 23, 2011
18	18	"Master Chief VS Doomguy (2011)"	11:47	Master Chief	October 28, 2011
19	19	"Doctor Eggman VS Doctor Wily"	14:35	Metal Sonic	December 25, 2011
20	20	"Princess Zelda VS Princess Peach"	8:45	Princess Peach	March 29, 2012
21	21	"Thor VS Raiden"	9:34	Thor	May 12, 2012
22	22	"Link VS Cloud Strife (2012)"	9:56	Link	July 13, 2012
23	23	"Batman VS Spider-Man"	9:38	Spider-Man	August 10, 2012
24	24	"Pikachu VS Blanka"	9:27	Blanka	September 20, 2012
25	25	"Goku VS Superman (2013)"	32:40	Superman	January 10, 2013

=== Season 2 (2013–2015) ===
No. overall	No. in season	Title	Length	Winner	Original release date
26	1	"He-Man VS Lion-O"	14:58	He-Man	May 21, 2013
27	2	"Shao Kahn VS M. Bison"	13:10	Shao Kahn	June 27, 2013
28	3	"Ryu Hayabusa VS Strider Hiryu"	11:14	Strider Hiryu	August 2, 2013
29	4	"Ivy Valentine VS Black Orchid"	10:22	Black Orchid	September 13, 2013
30	5	"Fox McCloud VS Bucky O'Hare"	12:57	Fox McCloud	November 8, 2013
31	6	"The Terminator VS RoboCop"	19:43	RoboCop	February 28, 2014
32	7	"Luigi VS Tails"	13:17	Tails	March 24, 2014
32.5	7.5	"Vegeta VS Mewtwo?" (Note: This bonus episode was a response to a Death Battle parody made by the YouTube channel Silvermania.)	1:51	The Internet	March 28, 2014
33	8	"Pokémon Starter Battle Royale (Venusaur VS Blastoise VS Charizard)"	12:40	Blastoise	April 12, 2014
34	9	"Fulgore VS Sektor"	12:15	Fulgore	May 17, 2014
35	10	"Godzilla VS Gamera"	19:20	Godzilla	August 17, 2014
36	11	"Batman VS Captain America"	14:43	Batman	September 7, 2014
37	12	"White Tigerzord VS Gundam Epyon"	20:00	Gundam Epyon	October 5, 2014
38	13	"Ryu VS Scorpion"	16:44	Scorpion	October 31, 2014
39	14	"Deadpool VS Deathstroke"	18:56	Deadpool	December 12, 2014
40	15	"Kirby VS Majin Buu"	20:20	Kirby	December 19, 2014
41	16	"Ragna the Bloodedge VS Sol Badguy"	15:15	Sol Badguy	January 9, 2015
42	17	"Gaara VS Toph Beifong"	18:18	Toph Beifong	February 7, 2015
43	18	"Boba Fett VS Samus Aran"	13:28	Samus Aran	February 26, 2015
44	19	"Chuck Norris VS Segata Sanshiro"	15:51	Draw	March 18, 2015
45	20	"Guts VS Nightmare"	18:46	Guts	April 8, 2015
46	21	"Iron Man VS Lex Luthor"	23:35	Iron Man	April 29, 2015
47	22	"Beast VS Goliath"	15:18	Goliath	May 20, 2015
48	23	"Solid Snake VS Sam Fisher"	21:57	Solid Snake	June 2, 2015
49	24	"Darth Vader VS Doctor Doom"	17:59	Doctor Doom	July 1, 2015
50	25	"Goku VS Superman 2" (Note: This episode acts as an extension of the original with both the research and animated fight.)	20:25	Superman	July 18, 2015
51	26	"Donkey Kong VS Knuckles"	18:30	Donkey Kong	August 12, 2015
52	27	"Wolverine VS Raiden"	17:57	Raiden	September 8, 2015
53	28	"Hercule Satan VS Dan Hibiki"	20:39	Hercule Satan	September 30, 2015
54	29	"Yang Xiao Long VS Tifa Lockhart"	15:09	Yang Xiao Long	October 20, 2015
55	30	"Mega Man VS Astro Boy"	16:52	Astro Boy	November 11, 2015
56	31	"Green Arrow VS Hawkeye"	19:10	Hawkeye	December 2, 2015
57	32	"Pokémon VS Digimon (Red & Charizard VS Tai Kamiya & Agumon)"	20:13	Tai Kamiya & Agumon	December 15, 2015

=== Season 3 (2016) ===
No. overall	No. in season	Title	Length	Winner	Original release date
58	1	"Dante VS Bayonetta"	22:26	Dante	March 16, 2016
59	2	"Bowser VS Ganon"	14:20	Ganon	April 6, 2016
60	3	"Ratchet & Clank VS Jak & Daxter"	19:49	Ratchet & Clank	April 27, 2016
61	4	"Flash VS Quicksilver"	17:26	Flash	May 18, 2016
62	5	"The Joker VS Sweet Tooth"	18:35	The Joker	June 8, 2016
63	6	"Mewtwo VS Shadow (2016)"	14:15	Mewtwo	July 1, 2016
64	7	"The Meta VS Agent Carolina" (Note: This episode was an official crossover with Rooster Teeth's Red vs. Blue, also being released as the 13th episode of that series' 14th season.)	17:55	Agent Carolina	August 3, 2016
65	8	"Cammy White VS Sonya Blade"	12:23	Sonya Blade	August 17, 2016
66	9	"Tracer VS Scout"	15:37	Tracer	September 7, 2016
67	10	"Ken Masters VS Terry Bogard"	13:34	Terry Bogard	September 28, 2016
68	11	"Amy Rose VS Ramona Flowers"	15:29	Amy Rose	October 19, 2016
69	12	"Hulk VS Doomsday"	20:50	Doomsday	November 9, 2016
70	13	"Roronoa Zoro VS Erza Scarlet"	15:56	Roronoa Zoro	November 30, 2016
71	14	"Deadpool VS Pinkie Pie"	17:20	Draw	December 21, 2016

=== Season 4 (2017) ===
No. overall	No. in season	Title	Length	Winner	Original release date
72	1	"Lara Croft VS Nathan Drake"	18:03	Lara Croft	February 1, 2017
73	2	"Scrooge McDuck VS Shovel Knight"	17:47	Scrooge McDuck	March 1, 2017
74	3	"Venom VS Bane"	18:35	Venom	March 22, 2017
75	4	"Power Rangers (Megazord) VS Voltron"	21:44	Voltron	April 12, 2017
76	5	"Natsu Dragneel VS Portgas D. Ace"	19:11	Natsu Dragneel	May 3, 2017
77	6	"Sub-Zero VS Glacius"	16:22	Sub-Zero	May 24, 2017
78	7	"Android 18 VS Captain Marvel"	19:27	Android 18	June 14, 2017
79	8	"Metal Sonic VS Zero"	18:02	Zero	July 5, 2017
80	9	"Lucario VS Renamon"	14:52	Lucario	July 26, 2017
81	10	"Balrog VS TJ Combo"	19:29	TJ Combo	August 16, 2017
82	11	"Shredder VS Silver Samurai"	18:46	Shredder	September 6, 2017
83	12	"Smokey Bear VS McGruff the Crime Dog"	17:10	Smokey Bear	September 27, 2017
84	13	"Thor VS Wonder Woman"	19:47	Wonder Woman	October 16, 2017
85	14	"Naruto Uzumaki VS Ichigo Kurosaki"	28:17	Naruto Uzumaki	November 8, 2017
86	15	"Batman Beyond VS Spider-Man 2099"	19:44	Batman Beyond	November 29, 2017
87	16	"Sephiroth VS Vergil"	21:58	Sephiroth	December 20, 2017

=== Season 5 (2018) ===
No. overall	No. in season	Title	Length	Winner	Original release date
88	1	"Black Panther VS Batman"	17:25	Black Panther	February 7, 2018
89	2	"Raven VS Twilight Sparkle"	20:18	Raven	February 28, 2018
90	3	"Jotaro Kujo VS Kenshiro"	16:17	Kenshiro	March 21, 2018
91	4	"Crash Bandicoot VS Spyro"	19:58	Spyro	April 11, 2018
92	5	"Sora VS Pit"	20:57	Sora	May 2, 2018
93	6	"Leon Kennedy VS Frank West"	19:41	Leon Kennedy	May 23, 2018
94	7	"Doctor Strange VS Doctor Fate"	20:24	Doctor Fate	June 13, 2018
95	8	"Ryu VS Jin Kazama"	20:23	Ryu	July 4, 2018
96	9	"Samurai Jack VS Afro Samurai"	17:56	Samurai Jack	July 25, 2018
97	10	"Carnage VS Lucy"	19:49	Lucy	August 15, 2018
98	11	"Optimus Prime VS RX-78-2 Gundam"	21:02	Optimus Prime	September 5, 2018
99	12	"Nightwing VS Daredevil"	20:15	Nightwing	September 26, 2018
100	13	"Mario VS Sonic"	20:34	Mario	October 17, 2018
101	14	"Ultron VS Sigma"	20:25	Ultron	November 7, 2018
102	15	"Master Roshi VS Jiraiya"	20:03	Master Roshi	November 28, 2018
103	16	"Thanos VS Darkseid"	26:43	Darkseid	December 19, 2018

=== Season 6 (2019) ===
No. overall	No. in season	Title	Length	Winner	Original release date
104	1	"Aquaman VS Namor"	18:26	Aquaman	February 6, 2019
105	2	"Mega Man Battle Royale (Classic VS X VS Mega Man Volnutt VS MegaMan.EXE VS Star Force Mega Man)"	27:36	MegaMan.EXE	February 27, 2019
106	3	"Black Widow VS Widowmaker"	20:33	Black Widow	March 20, 2019
107	4	"Captain Marvel VS Shazam"	19:01	Shazam	April 10, 2019
108	5	"Wario VS King Dedede"	21:52	King Dedede	May 1, 2019
109	6	"Ben 10 VS Green Lantern"	22:14	Green Lantern	May 22, 2019
110	7	"Weiss Schnee VS Mitsuru Kirijo"	20:40	Mitsuru Kirijo	June 12, 2019
111	8	"Johnny Cage VS Captain Falcon"	19:01	Captain Falcon	July 3, 2019
112	9	"Aang VS Edward Elric"	20:07	Aang	July 24, 2019
113	10	"Ghost Rider VS Lobo"	22:04	Ghost Rider	August 14, 2019
114	11	"Dragonzord VS Mechagodzilla"	21:46	Mechagodzilla	September 4, 2019
115	12	"Sasuke Uchiha VS Hiei"	22:51	Hiei	September 25, 2019
116	13	"Ganondorf VS Dracula"	22:38	Dracula	October 16, 2019
117	14	"Mob VS Tatsumaki"	22:18	Tatsumaki	November 6, 2019
118	15	"Deadpool VS The Mask"	20:52	The Mask	November 27, 2019
119	16	"All Might VS Might Guy"	21:36	Might Guy	December 18, 2019

=== Season 7 (2020) ===
No. overall	No. in season	Title	Length	Winner	Original release date
120	1	"Spider-Man (Miles Morales) VS Static"	17:36	Static	January 27, 2020
121	2	"Black Canary VS Sindel"	16:29	Black Canary	February 10, 2020
122	3	"Leonardo VS Red Ranger Jason"	17:40	Red Ranger Jason	February 24, 2020
123	4	"Genos VS War Machine"	17:12	War Machine	March 9, 2020
124	5	"Gray Fullbuster VS Esdeath"	18:28	Esdeath	March 23, 2020
125	6	"Goro VS Machamp"	16:27	Machamp	April 6, 2020
126	7	"Cable VS Booster Gold"	19:31	Booster Gold	April 20, 2020
127	8	"Obi-Wan Kenobi VS Kakashi Hatake"	18:38	Obi-Wan Kenobi	May 4, 2020
128	9	"Danny Phantom VS American Dragon Jake Long"	15:01	Danny Phantom	May 18, 2020
129	10	"She-Ra VS Wonder Woman"	18:15	Wonder Woman	June 1, 2020
130	11	"Beerus VS Sailor Galaxia"	18:04	Beerus	August 10, 2020
131	12	"Zuko VS Shoto Todoroki"	18:21	Shoto Todoroki	August 24, 2020
132	13	"Flash (Wally West) VS Sonic (Archie Comics)"	21:09	Flash	September 7, 2020
132.5	13.5	"The Seven Battle Royale (Queen Maeve VS A-Train VS The Deep VS Starlight VS Billy Butcher)" (Note: This was a bonus episode sponsored by Amazon to commemorate the second season of The Boys)	19:01 (Note: Unlike other episodes, the breakdown explaining the fight's results was released in a separate video.)	Billy Butcher	September 17, 2020
133	14	"Winter Soldier VS Red Hood"	22:02	Winter Soldier	September 21, 2020
134	15	"Venom VS Crona"	20:01	Crona	October 5, 2020
135	16	"Sabrewulf VS Jon Talbain"	20:01	Jon Talbain	November 1, 2020
136	17	"Red VS Blue"	20:18	The Blue Team	November 16, 2020
137	18	"Batgirl VS Spider-Gwen"	17:53	Spider-Gwen	November 30, 2020
138	19	"Sanji VS Rock Lee"	19:07	Sanji	December 14, 2020
139	20	"Hulk VS Broly"	23:31	Broly	December 28, 2020

=== Season 8 (2021) ===
No. overall	No. in season	Title	Length	Winner	Original release date
140	1	"Yoda VS King Mickey"	19:01	King Mickey	March 8, 2021
141	2	"Shadow VS Ryūko Matoi"	19:50	Shadow	March 21, 2021
142	3	"Lex Luthor VS Doctor Doom"	19:36	Doctor Doom	April 4, 2021
143	4	"Heihachi Mishima VS Geese Howard"	19:52	Heihachi Mishima	April 15, 2021
144	5	"Blake Belladonna VS Mikasa Ackerman"	17:58	Blake Belladonna	May 2, 2021
145	6	"Iron Fist VS Po"	17:56	Po	May 16, 2021
146	7	"Steven Universe VS Star Butterfly"	20:11	Star Butterfly	May 30, 2021
147	8	"Link VS Cloud Strife"	18:41	Cloud Strife	June 13, 2021
148	9	"Batman VS Iron Man"	21:56	Iron Man	September 12, 2021
149	10	"Goku Black VS Reverse-Flash"	22:39	Reverse-Flash	September 26, 2021
150	11	"Macho Man Randy Savage VS Kool-Aid Man"	14:13	Kool-Aid Man	October 10, 2021
151	12	"DIO VS Alucard"	24:10	DIO	October 24, 2021
152	13	"Akuma VS Shao Kahn"	19:06	Shao Kahn	November 7, 2021
153	14	"Korra VS Storm"	20:51	Storm	November 21, 2021
154	15	"Madara Uchiha vs Sousuke Aizen"	23:22	Madara Uchiha	December 5, 2021
155	16	"Saitama VS Popeye"	22:11	Popeye	December 19, 2021

=== Season 9 (2022) ===
No. overall	No. in season	Title	Length	Winner	Original release date
156	1	"Harley Quinn VS Jinx"	20:27	Jinx	March 28, 2022
157	2	"Scarlet Witch VS Zatanna"	21:02	Zatanna	April 11, 2022
158	3	"Tanjiro Kamado VS Jonathan Joestar"	18:31	Jonathan Joestar	April 25, 2022
159	4	"Thor VS Vegeta"	21:28	Thor	May 9, 2022
160	5	"Omni-Man VS Homelander"	18:19	Omni-Man	May 23, 2022
161	6	"Magneto VS Tetsuo"	20:20	Magneto	June 6, 2022
162	7	"Hercules VS Sun Wukong"	20:47	Sun Wukong	June 20, 2022
163	8	"Boba Fett VS Predator"	18:40	Boba Fett	July 4, 2022
163.5	8.5	"Excalibur VS Raiden" (Note: This was a bonus episode sponsored by Warframe. At the end of the episode, Singer disclosed that the game's developers did not dictate the victor of the episode or the matchup and were fine with the result going either way.)	18:51	Excalibur	July 11, 2022
164	9	"James Bond VS John Wick"	22:12	James Bond	September 5, 2022
165	10	"Black Adam VS Apocalypse"	20:21	Apocalypse	September 19, 2022
166	11	"Trunks (Xenoverse) VS Silver (Archie Comics)"	20:59	Silver	October 3, 2022
167	12	"SpongeBob SquarePants VS Aquaman (Super Friends)"	22:04	SpongeBob SquarePants	October 17, 2022
168	13	"Jason Voorhees VS Michael Myers"	17:42	Jason Voorhees	October 31, 2022
169	14	"Sauron VS Lich King"	21:35	Sauron	November 14, 2022
170	15	"Deku VS Asta"	21:34	Asta	November 28, 2022
171	16	"Gogeta VS Vegito"	19:26	Vegito	December 21, 2022

=== Season 10 (2023) ===
No. overall	No. in season	Title	Length	Winner	Original release date
172	1	"Ant-Man VS Atom"	20:59	Ant-Man	May 22, 2023
173	2	"Chosen Undead VS Last Dragonborn"	22:25	Last Dragonborn	June 5, 2023
174	3	"Killua Zoldyck VS Mikoto Misaka"	20:08	Mikoto Misaka	June 19, 2023
175	4	"Stitch VS Rocket Raccoon"	18:41	Stitch	July 3, 2023
176	5	"Darth Vader VS Obito Uchiha"	20:16	Obito Uchiha	July 17, 2023
177	6	"Phoenix VS Raven"	20:53	Raven	July 31, 2023
178	7	"Guts VS Dimitri"	20:59	Dimitri	August 14, 2023
179	8	"Martian Manhunter VS Silver Surfer"	23:09	Silver Surfer	August 28, 2023
180	9	"Bill Cipher VS Discord"	19:57	Bill Cipher	September 11, 2023
181	10	"Cole MacGrath VS Alex Mercer"	18:33	Cole MacGrath	September 25, 2023
182	11	"Frieza VS Megatron"	21:43	Frieza	October 9, 2023
183	12	"Satoru Gojo VS Makima"	22:44	Satoru Gojo	October 23, 2023
184	13	"Scooby-Doo VS Courage the Cowardly Dog"	20:12	Draw	November 6, 2023
185	14	"Rick Sanchez VS The Doctor"	21:50	The Doctor	November 20, 2023
186	15	"Goku VS Superman"	25:27	Superman	December 4, 2023
187	16	"Galactus VS Unicron"	21:21	Galactus	December 18, 2023

=== 2024 episodes ===
After Death Battle became independent, the show stopped using the original season format, with episodes instead being internally categorized by year of release.

No. overall	No. in season	Title	Length	Winner	Original release date
188	1	"Omni-Man VS Bardock"	21:10	Omni-Man	October 6, 2024
189	2	"Joker VS Giorno Giovanna"	17:57	Joker	October 27, 2024
190	3	"Bowser VS Doctor Eggman"	27:09	Bowser	November 17, 2024
191	4	"Among Us VS Fall Guys"	19:24	Fall Guys	December 8, 2024

=== 2025 episodes ===
No. overall	No. in season	Title	Length	Winner	Original release date
192	1	"Kratos VS Asura"	28:57	Kratos	February 2, 2025
193	2	"Ghost Rider VS Spawn"	24:12	Spawn	March 2, 2025
194	3	"Tomura Shigaraki VS Mahito"	24:08	Tomura Shigaraki	March 29, 2025
195	4	"Master Chief VS Doom Slayer"	23:43	Doom Slayer	April 27, 2025
196	5	"Simon the Digger VS Kyle Rayner (White Lantern)"	24:51	Simon the Digger	May 25, 2025
197	6	"Wile E. Coyote VS Tom Cat"	21:41	Wile E. Coyote	June 22, 2025
198	7	"Spider-Man (Miles Morales) VS Deku"	19:58	Deku	July 20, 2025
199	8	"Hulk VS Godzilla"	25:30	Hulk/Bruce Banner	August 24, 2025
200	9	"Ruby Rose VS Maka Albarn"	22:33	Maka Albarn	September 21, 2025
201	10	"Blade VS Buffy Summers"	27:47	Buffy Summers	October 12, 2025
202	11	"Dante VS Clive Rosfield"	23:50	Clive Rosfield	November 9, 2025
203	12	"Ash Ketchum VS Yugi Muto"	30:40	Yugi Muto	December 7, 2025

=== 2026 episodes ===
No. overall	No. in season	Title	Length	Winner	Original release date
204	1	"Ichigo Kurosaki VS Yusuke Urameshi"	24:22	Ichigo Kurosaki	February 8, 2026
205	2	"Cell VS Metal Sonic"	25:22	Metal Sonic	March 8, 2026
206	3	"Katsuki Bakugo VS Reze"	22:13	Katsuki Bakugo	April 5, 2026
207	4	"Gru VS Megamind"	23:14	Gru	May 3, 2026
208	5	"Yuji VS Denji"	24:02	Denji	May 31, 2026
209	6	"The Sentry VS Superboy-Prime"	24:49	Superboy-Prime	June 28, 2026
210	7	"Aang VS Traveler"	23:55	Traveler	July 26, 2026
211	8	"Kai VS Tahu"	23:45	Kai	August 23, 2026
212	9	"Shadow VS Mewtwo"	25:39	Shadow	September 20, 2026
213	10	"Goku VS Saitama"	24:23	Goku	October 18, 2026
214	11	"Naruto Uzumaki VS Monkey D. Luffy"	30:35	Naruto Uzumaki	November 22, 2026
215	12	"Doctor Doom VS Vecna"	TBA	TBA	TBA

== Reception ==
Death Battle is one of the most popular web series dedicated to battleboarding, and the show's YouTube channel has been described as a "central hub" for fans of the genre. The show has a cult following, and several online communities exist both for discussing the show and writing fan-made episodes. It also inspired similar shows such as Super Power Beat Down and Grudge Match. Death Battle helped popularize the use of mathematical calculations to determine the strength of fictional characters; in the battleboarding fandom, such calculations are called "calcs".

The show has also inspired a number of fan fiction sites and crossover fiction, most notably Death Battle Fanon Wiki. It has also faced occasional controversy and backlash online surrounding the chosen winners of some episodes.
