= Armand Dorian =

American physician

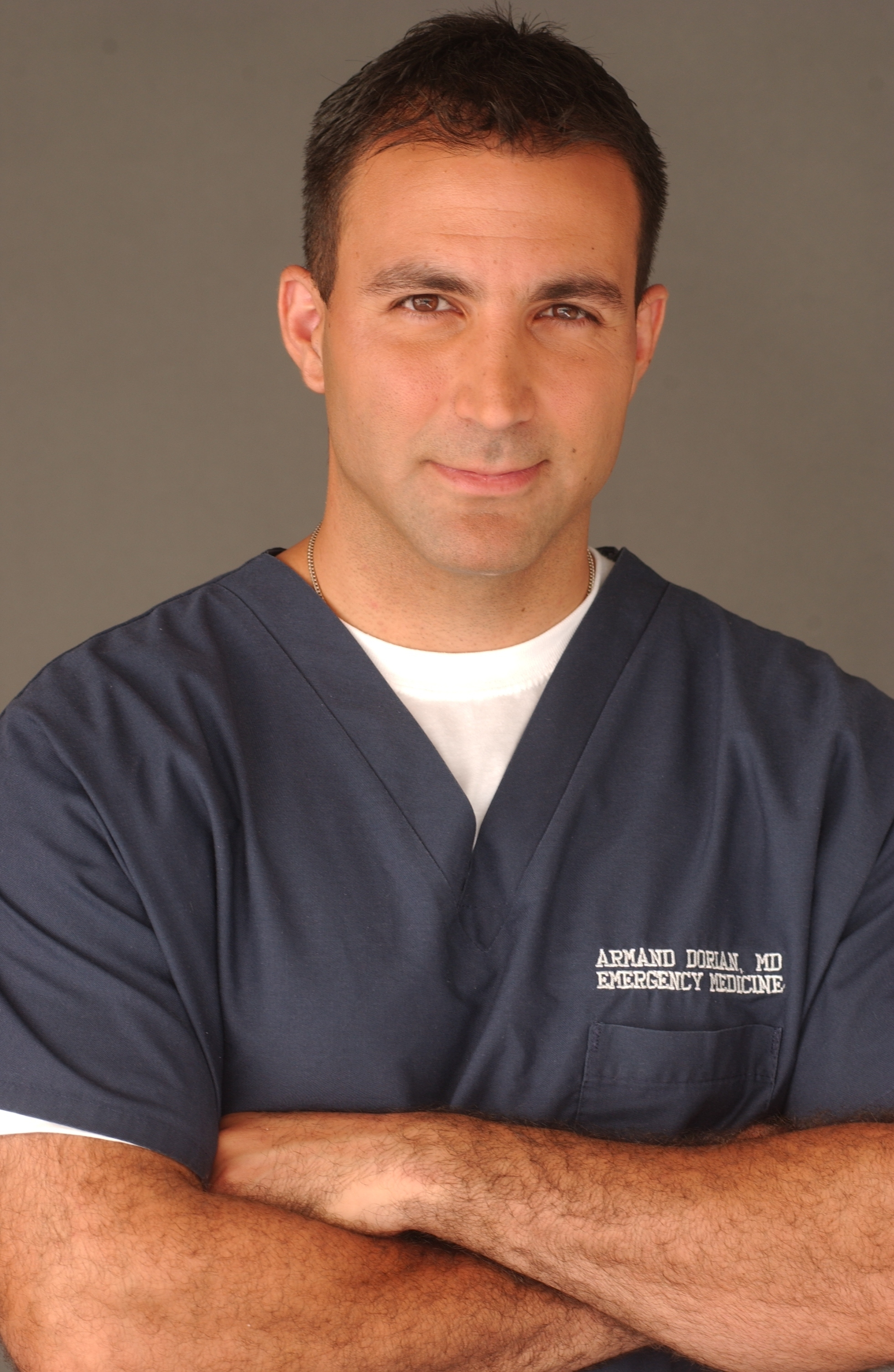
- Armand Dorian
- Born: Los Angeles, California

Armand Dorian is an American doctor and medical consultant. He is the president and chief executive officer of USC Verdugo Hills Hospital and a clinical professor of emergency medicine at the USC Keck School of Medicine. He is most well-known for his role on Deadliest Warrior.

== Education ==
Dorian was born and raised in Los Angeles, California. Dorian graduated with a major in biology with an emphasis in philosophy from UCLA. He received his MD from the John A. Burns School of Medicine, University of Hawaii. He continued residency training at the UCLA Emergency Medicine Residency Program. He then graduated from the USC Marshall School of Business with a Masters in Medical Management.

== Career ==
He has performed research and published in human genomics and tropical biology. In 2000, upon graduation and receipt of his Board Certification, he joined the staff at both UCLA/Westwood and UCLA/Olive View hospitals. He became a fellow of the American College of Emergency Physicians.

In January 2015, he became the Director of the Emergency Department at Verdugo Hills Hospital and later was appointed to the position of Chief of Development and Treasurer. In 2018, he was appointed the Chief Medical Officer of USC Verdugo Hills Hospital. In 2021, he was appointed the Chief Executive Officer of USC Verdugo Hills Hospital.

From 2009 to 2011 he served as the trauma and medical expert on the Spike TV series Deadliest Warrior, evaluating the lethality of simulated weapons and injuries. Alongside his clinical and administrative work, Dorian has worked since the mid-2000s as a medical consultant and on-camera expert for network television and film productions, including ER, Grey's Anatomy, Days of Our Lives, Hawthorne, and Southland.

== Personal life ==
Dorian is married and has three children.
