= Tao (spear) =

Tao is a word in Polynesian languages and can have a number of different meanings.

In Samoan and Māori, a tao is a long traditional wooden spear.

The word also has another meaning in the Samoan language; tao also means 'to bake' or 'roast' in a traditional oven made of hot rocks above ground.
