= Animal Face-Off =

- Title card
- Directed by: Malcolm Hall
- Narrated by: Scott Dreier
- Country of origin: United States
- No. of seasons: 1
- No. of episodes: 12

Production
- Executive producers: Andrew Waterworth; Michael Stedman
- Producer: Nick Bleszynski
- Running time: 60 minutes (episodes 1-11); 120 minutes (episode 12)

Original release
- Network: Discovery Channel; Animal Planet
- Release: March 21 – September 12, 2004

Animal Face-Off is an American television program that aired on the Discovery Channel and Animal Planet in 2004.

== Synopsis ==
This program, produced by NHNZ, centers on hypothetical battles between two animals that could meet in the wild, or, in some cases, have been compared to each other by scientists. CGI replicas and models were used to collect data (such as strength, bite force, etc.) about the animals. Then, in a virtual arena, a brief computer-animated fight scene reveals the results. Since the fights are created artificially, results in real life may vary. Each episode of Animal Face-Off is one hour long, with the exception of the 12th episode, "Sperm Whale vs. Colossal Squid", which is two hours long.

== Episodes ==
No. in series	Title	Location	Winner
1	"Saltwater Crocodile vs. Great White Shark"	Australia	Great white shark
Off the coast of Australia, a female great white shark roams near the shore looking for food; a male saltwater crocodile swims nearby, seeking new territory. The shark hits the crocodile with the bump-and-bite technique. Accustomed to defending himself against rivals, the crocodile bites the shark's tail, but cannot get a good grip. The shark swims off and makes a wide turn for a full-on assault; suddenly, the crocodile gets the first bite on her right pectoral fin. The bite tears off the shark's fin, helped by the classic death roll. Despite her injury, the shark remains strong. Then, the crocodile grabs the shark's snout with his crushing bite. This time, the shark cannot fight back; the crocodile attempts another death roll. After that, they both sink. Running out of air, the crocodile breaks and heads straight to the surface. The shark takes advantage; with the crocodile's soft underbelly exposed, she comes back with a textbook attack and kills the crocodile with a powerful bite.
2	"African Bush Elephant vs. White Rhinoceros"	Botswana	African bush elephant
In the plains of Botswana, a male rhinoceros leaves his mud hole to find food; nearby, a bull elephant in musth roams, also seeking good grazing. The rhino begins grazing but suddenly feels the ground shaking and turns to see the elephant. Because of his poor eyesight, the ill-tempered rhinoceros sees him as a threat and prepares to charge. The elephant responds with a loud trumpet, and the smaller animal does not hesitate to charge, but the smarter elephant anticipates the attack, charges too, and dodges. The rhinoceros returns and tries to stab the elephant's throat, but he is too tall, even with his four-foot horn. The rhinoceros then tries an agile headbutt, but the elephant proves better with his seven-foot tusks. Soon enough, the elephant turns his rival around and stabs him twice with his tusks, though one breaks and gets stuck in the rhinoceros. The elephant then charges, headbutts the rhinoceros, and crushes him under his weight before stepping off and trumpeting in victory.
3	"Asiatic Lion vs. Bengal Tiger"	India	Asiatic Lion
A male lion wanders through an abandoned Indian temple when he suddenly spots a male tiger feeding nearby. The lion roars at his larger, striped relative to back off, but the tiger ignores the warning. The lion then charges at the tiger but trips on him on impact, catching the tiger off guard. Quickly seizing the opportunity, the agile tiger recovers and repeatedly tries to bite the lion's throat, but the lion shakes off the attack, and the combatants are back to square one. Both cats roar, claw, and wrestle, but neither lands a fatal blow. The tiger tries to end the fight with a fatal neck bite, but the lion's mane deflects his aim. The tiger then charges, but the lion deflects the attack, catches the tiger off guard again, and delivers the killing blow to the tiger's neck before roaring in victory.
4	"Hippopotamus vs. Bull Shark"	Zambezi	Hippopotamus
An injured male hippopotamus rests in his stretch of the Zambezi River, unaware that a female bull shark is roaming nearby, looking for food. The shark catches the smell of meat but does not know where it is coming from. The shark starts the encounter with an exploratory bump. After confirming the hippo is indeed food, the shark bites the side, but the hippo's massive girth and weight are too much for the smaller shark. Even the thin skin on the back leg proves too tough. Still, the shark rips off the hippo's tail. All the while, the hippo roars in pain, not knowing what hit him, but his bad temper lights a fire in his belly. Soon, the hippopotamus submerges and spots the deadly shark. The enraged hippo comes towards the shark and opens his mouth, revealing his huge, sharp, foot-long canine teeth, but the bull shark keeps coming and is finally crushed and killed when the larger hippo closes his mouth on her, ending the fight.
5	"Cougar vs. Wolf"	Rocky Mountains	Cougar
In the Rocky Mountains, an alpha male wolf eats the carcass of a large deer; from a distance, a male cougar catches the smell of meat and comes to investigate. When the cougar comes across the wolf, he thinks about how to steal the meal. Soon after, the wolf notices the cougar and growls – the cougar growls in response. The wolf soon charges forward and bites the cougar's hind leg, but backs off when the cougar pounces with his front legs and lethal claws. The wolf howls to his pack for backup. Realizing he is in grave danger, the cougar tries to retreat, but the wolf bites his paw. Furious, the cougar rolls onto his back, rakes the wolf with his claws, and throws him to the ground, killing him instantly. The cougar prepares to eat, but he then hears the wolf pack approaching. With no choice, he leaves the kill and flees straight into the forest.
6	"Walrus vs. Polar Bear"	Arctic Circle	Walrus
A hungry male polar bear approaches a male walrus relaxing by the water's edge to attack. Startled and nervous, the walrus heads straight for the sea. The bear attempts to bite and scratch the walrus, but the pinniped's thick skin is too much. Although he briefly latches on with his sharp teeth, the bear cannot do much serious damage. The walrus then tries to stab the bear with his four-foot tusks, but the agile predator anticipates this. The bear then tries several paw swipes at the head, but the walrus's skull is too thick to land a killing blow. As the walrus flees, the bear holds on and gets dragged into the ocean; afterward, the walrus turns around and gores the bear with his tusks. Wounded and running out of air, the bear heads straight back to the surface. But the walrus returns with a vengeance – he soon stabs the carnivore's back, killing him. The dead bear sinks into the ocean.
7	"Ussuri Brown Bear vs. Siberian Tiger"	Siberia	Ussuri brown bear
In the Siberian woodlands in winter, a male Siberian tiger feasts on his kill, while a large male brown bear roams around, looking for one more meal before going into hibernation. The tiger then suddenly spots the bear. Not in the mood to share, the tiger roars at the bear to back off, but the bear ignores the warning and keeps advancing. The tiger tries a body blow, but the bear absorbs the impact without losing balance. The tiger then tries to land a killing blow on the bear's neck, but the bear pushes him down. The bear then approaches the kill, but the tiger recovers and pounces from behind, slashing with his claws, but fails to disable him. The much stronger bear turns around and, using his superior strength against the tiger's speed and agility, overpowers the tiger by pawing his face. The bear then breaks the tiger's spine and finishes him off with a neck bite.
8	"Lion vs. Nile Crocodile"	Maasai Mara	Nile crocodile
A male lion is eating by the river's edge when a male crocodile emerges from the water, intent on stealing the meal. Seeing this, the lion roars at the crocodile to back off, but he gets little more than a loud hiss in return. The lion attacks, but cannot land a deadly blow because of the crocodile's thick body armor. The lion tries to flip the crocodile to reach its unarmored belly, but a roll and tail swipe stop him. Determined to get rid of the lion, the crocodile heads back to the water and disappears from view. Determined to protect his kill, the lion stays close to the water's edge, looking for an opportunity to kill the crocodile. Suddenly, it is too late. The crocodile launches a surprise attack, grabs the lion by the neck, and drags him into the water. The crocodile soon performs a death roll, killing the lion at once and ending the fight.
9	"Jaguar vs. Green Anaconda"	Amazon rainforest	Green anaconda
A female anaconda hunts in the Amazon River. However, a male jaguar is stalking nearby. The big cat then enters the water, right in front of the giant snake. The jaguar stops briefly, apparently sensing the reptile, but is distracted by a bird calling in the distance. This lapse in attention gives the anaconda the perfect opportunity to strike, and the snake begins to coil around her victim. The force of the anaconda's strike knocks the big cat off his feet and into the water. The big cat furiously claws at the anaconda and bites her tail. Injured, the snake tries to retreat, but begins to be dragged ashore by the jaguar. However, most of the giant snake's tail is free and coils around the jaguar, and the anaconda can turn back and strike. This time, the anaconda completely restrains the jaguar, who is too tired and wounded to struggle any further, ending the fight.
10	"African Leopard vs. Mountain Gorilla"	Central Africa	Mountain gorilla
A silverback mountain gorilla leaves his family in the trees to find a place to sleep. Around the same time, a female leopard leaves her cubs to go hunting. The leopard then sees the gorilla walking by and interprets him as a threat. Seeing the leopard, the gorilla also sees it as a threat to his troop. He tries to avoid a fight, beating his chest and growling and howling, but the leopard does not flinch. The leopard leaps onto a cliffside, jumps onto the gorilla's back, and bites his shoulder. The gorilla throws the leopard off, but she leaps again onto his back. The gorilla throws the leopard off again, knocks her off balance, and chomps down on her shoulder before she gets free. Both opponents stare and roar at each other. Desperate, the leopard makes a final lunge at the gorilla, but he throws his powerful arm onto her spine, breaking it and killing the leopard, ending the fight and also orphaning her cubs.
11	"American Black Bear vs. American Alligator"	Everglades	American black bear
On a hot day in the Everglades, a male black bear goes into a lake to drink, not knowing a male alligator is resting underneath. The alligator wakes up and sees the bear, but the bear has also spotted the alligator and tries to retreat. The alligator ambushes the bear, grabs his leg, and does the classic death roll, but all he gets is a mouthful of fur, fat, and muscle. Hurt, but not fatally wounded, and still strong, the bear fights back by slashing the alligator's mouth. The alligator then tries a tail smack, but the smarter bear anticipates it; knowing he is vulnerable on land, the alligator tries to retreat, but the enraged bear lunges. The alligator tries to roll free of the bear's grab, but this gives the bear the advantage to flip him over, which exposes the alligator's soft underbelly, which the bear slashes fatally, killing the alligator; the bear leaves as the alligator's dead body rots on the riverbank.
12	"Sperm Whale vs. Colossal Squid"	Antarctic Ocean	Sperm Whale
A bull sperm whale dives into the deep abyss, while a female colossal squid rockets through the depths. Both combatants sense each other – the squid sees the whale, while the whale's echolocation reveals the squid's location. Seeing the whale as a potential predator, the squid releases a burst of ink as a warning, but the whale ignores it and slowly attacks the huge squid. Just before she reaches the whale's mouth, the squid latches on and rakes him with her hooked suction cups, wounding him in the process. By rising close to the surface, the squid is shaken off, but not before she scratches the whale further. Although wounded, the whale amplifies his sonar and stuns the squid. The paralyzed cephalopod is helpless – and thus eaten alive.

== See also ==
- Deadliest Warrior
- Death Battle
