= List of RWBY characters =

This is a list of characters who appear in RWBY, an original anime-style CG-animated web series created by Rooster Teeth Productions. According to series creator Monty Oum, every character's name is tied to a specific color. There are also other teams with their name combining to form acronyms that are also tied to a color.

== Creation and conception ==
Oum designed the characters with assistance from artist Ein Lee. Oum had been browsing Lee's DeviantArt work and asked if she wanted to do some designs. The only rule provided for the series was "everyone must be badass." Lee also said that some of the characters were conceived between her and Oum, where he would provide a description followed by her sketching some ideas, or vice versa. Others were from brainstorming with other people. The characters utilize designs inspired by classic fairy tale characters. Each character has an associated color, and it is the first letters of these colors, red, white, black, and yellow, that give the series its name. Lee said that looking to people, Google image searches, and fashion were inspirations: "how people dress−down to the littlest detail—gives many subtle (and some not so subtle) hints about who they are. It's all about giving the characters a unique and memorable look that people can still identify with." Oum also drew inspiration from the Final Fantasy video games and the "ridiculously obnoxious weapons".

The series was written by Oum, along with fellow Rooster Teeth employees Miles Luna and Kerry Shawcross. Oum was initially concerned about a story focusing on female characters being developed by a primarily male crew, but said they managed to do well developing the female characters.

== Protagonists ==
=== Team RWBY ===
Team RWBY (pronounced "ruby") is composed of four female students from Beacon Academy.^{Vol. 1} Each member is associated with a color and alludes to a character in the fairy tale world—reflected in their names and personalities.

Ruby Rose

- Voiced by: Lindsay Jones (Note: Lindsay Jones was credited as Lindsay Tuggey for volumes 1 and 2^{Vol. 1 and 2 credits}) / Saori Hayami

A silver-eyed girl who uses a scythe called Crescent Rose as both a melee weapon and as a high caliber sniper rifle. Her Semblance is called "Petal Burst", which enables her to transform into a fast burst of rose petals, allowing for near-instant short-range intangibility and teleportation. Penny Polendina described Ruby's semblance as "extremely complex and variable. It involves breaking her body down to its molecular components before zooming off in complex paths, negating the laws of mass entirely." Initially, it was thought that Ruby's ability was primarily super-speed, enabling her to run faster than the human eye can catch, and change directions in mid-air.^{Vol. 1, Ch. 14 & Vol. 4, Ch. 1} When her mother Summer vanished when she was very young, Ruby was raised on the island of Patch by her father Taiyang and her older half-sister Yang Xiao Long.^{Vol. 1, Ch. 1 & Vol. 2, Ch. 6}

Ruby alludes to the fairy tale character Little Red Riding Hood.

Weiss Schnee

- Voiced By: Kara Eberle^{Vol. 1 credits}, Casey Lee Williams (singing voice), Elizabeth Maxwell (Young) / Yōko Hikasa

The former heiress to the Schnee family, a powerful high-class family based in Atlas. Their Schnee Dust Company provides much of the worldwide supply of Dust, despite the family being targeted by the White Fang due to the immoral business ethics of Weiss' father Jacques, which included mistreatment of Faunus laborers.^{Vol. 1, Ch. 15} While inheriting her family's white hair and blue eyes, Weiss gained a noticeable scar over her left eye as a result of fighting an Arma Gigas.^{White Trailer} Weiss uses a Dust-loaded revolver/rapier-hybrid named Myrtenaster. Weiss's semblance, called Semblance of Glyphs, is extremely rare because it's hereditary; females of the Schnee family all have the same semblance. This semblance allows Weiss to create glyphs enhanced with Dust that can be utilize in a variety of ways, on either herself, her allies or enemies: perform limited time dilation, manipulate gravity, freezing the terrain, fire projectiles, block attacks, generate midair platforms, and summon creatures. Weiss's fighting style consists of a mixture of these glyphs, Dust and her weapon. Weiss chose to become a Huntress at Beacon Academy with aspirations of restoring her family's honor, as she disagreed with her father's business methods.^{Vol. 2, Ch. 9–10} The Nightmare version of Weiss, known as Negative Weiss, serves as the main antagonist of the Ice Queendom.

Weiss alludes to Snow White, as her full name Weiss Schnee is German for "White Snow". Character designer Ein Lee said that Weiss was her favorite character among the four main girls to draw: "She's so delicate, and I love princess types."

Blake Belladonna

- Voiced By: Arryn Zech^{Vol. 1 credits} / Yū Shimamura

A cat Faunus with a love for books. She is a former member of the White Fang who left in disgust over the increasing brutality and callous disregard for civilian lives by her former lover and mentor Adam.^{Black Trailer} Blake's weapon is the Gambol Shroud, a "variant ballistic chain scythe" according to Oum with a sharpened sheath that has a pistol in the hilt, which is also attached to a long ribbon. Blake uses blade and sheath in attacking combinations, while also using the momentum of the blade anchored to an object to maneuver herself with the ribbon, even in midair. Her Semblance, "Shadow", allows her to create a hollow clone of herself that functions as an afterimage decoy while she moves in a different direction. Blake can give the clone an additional effect depending on the type of Dust used, such as teleporting between them, or absorbing hits for her or her friends.^{Vol. 1, Ch. 8} In Volume 9, Blake and Yang confess their feelings for each other and become a couple.^{Vol. 9, Ch. 6}

Blake is an allusion to Beauty and the Beast, arguably to both Belle and the beast.

Yang Xiao Long

- Voiced By: Barbara Dunkelman^{Vol. 1 credits} / Ami Koshimizu

A blonde-haired girl and Ruby's older half-sister. She wields twin shotgun gauntlets called Ember Celica. After she loses her right arm to Adam Taurus (and with it, the gauntlet that was still on) in Volume 3, her replacement bionic arm is installed with a shotgun mechanism at the wrist.^{Vol. 5, Ch. 4} In Volume 7, Yang has Pietro add sticky grenades to her arsenal.^{Vol. 7, Ch. 3} Her Semblance, "Burn", works on a "recoil-based system"; it lets her store up energy from taking hits. The harder enemies hit her the harder she's able to hit them back. In Volume 9, Yang and Blake confess their feelings for each other and become a couple.^{Vol. 9, Ch. 6}

Yang is an allusion to Goldilocks.

=== Team JNPR ===
Team JNPR (pronounced "juniper"), renamed JNR ("junior") after the loss of Pyrrha, is inspired by historical figures who had taken on the appearance of the opposite gender. In Volume 4, Ruby temporarily joins their group and they informally rename themselves Team RNJR ("ranger") under her leadership.

Jaune Arc

- Voiced By: Miles Luna^{Vol. 1 credits} / Hiro Shimono

A blond-haired student and the leader of Team JNPR who uses a sword and shield combination called Crocea Mors, an heirloom formerly belonging to his great-great-grandfather. His shield can fold into a sheath for his sword, although it retains its weight.^{Vol. 1} In Volume 4, Jaune upgraded the shield so that it can act as a second blade for the sword.^{Vol. 4, Ch. 12} In Volume 7, the shield is further upgraded by Pietro with hardened light Dust on the sides that Jaune can use to act as a glider in air, and the crest can now hold Dust.^{Vol. 7, Ch. 3} His Semblance, "Aura Amp", allows him to amplify his Aura or that of others, and he can quickly recharge his Aura even when broken by Volume 7.^{Vol. 7, Ch. 6} After arriving in the Ever After in volume 9, Jaune picked a fruit that sent him decades back in time which resulted in him becoming the Rusted Knight, a fairytale character from the Girl Who Fell Through the World.^{Vol. 9, Ch. 5-10}

His name is a reference to the French heroine Joan of Arc.

Nora Valkyrie

- Voiced By: Samantha Ireland,^{Vol. 1 credits} Kristen McGuire (Young) / Aya Suzaki

An orange-haired student at Beacon and old friend of Ren who carries Magnhild, a war hammer that can be converted into a grenade launcher. In Volume 4, Nora has upgraded Magnhild, so that it can apparently hold a stronger electric charge.^{Vol. 4, Ch. 1} Her Semblance, "High Voltage", is the production and manipulation of electricity, allowing her to channel the energy to her muscles and gain superhuman strength.^{Vol. 3, Ch. 2} Nora is very talkative and hyperactive, which tends to annoy her teammates, but she's also the most positive member of the team. Nora was living on the streets of Kuroyuri when she was a child. When the village was attacked by Grimm, Ren saved her, beginning their friendship.^{Vol. 4, Ch. 10 & Vol. 8, Ch. 11} Nora eventually admits her love for Ren but wants to find her own identity before entering a relationship with him.^{Vol. 8, Ch. 11}

Her first name comes from the Nora Barlow Columbine, while her last name, "Valkyrie", is inspired by the female warriors found in Norse mythology. She alludes to the Norse god Thor. According to the show's producers, the concept of her weapon was based on the annual Festival of Exploding Hammers in Mexico.

Pyrrha Nikos

- Voiced By: Jen Brown^{Vol. 1 credits} / Megumi Toyoguchi (Volumes 1–2, Volume 3 (Blu-Ray/DVD)), Shizuka Itō (Volume 3 (TV))

A red-haired student with a long ponytail and bright green eyes. She wielded Miló, a javelin that could transform into a rifle or a xiphos sword, and a shield called Akoúo̱. Her Semblance is "Polarity", which is the ability to manipulate objects with magnetism.^{Vol. 1, Ch. 14}

Due to her many achievements, Pyrrha has earned a reputation that makes forming relationships with others difficult because others often assume she is "too good for them". As such when Jaune treats her normally, she chooses him as her partner during the initiation and becomes attracted to him.^{Vol. 1, Ch. 5 & Vol. 2, Ch. 6–7} Pyrrha was chosen by Ozpin as the next Fall Maiden which she initially hesitated to accept,^{Vol. 3, Ch. 6 & 8} but decides to go through with it, but Cinder kills Amber and takes the full power for herself. After confessing her feelings to Jaune, Pyrrha faces Cinder alone but is killed.^{Vol. 3, Ch. 12}. After the fall of Beacon, a memorial statue of Pyrrha was made in her honor in Argus.^{Vol. 6, Ch. 9}

Monty Oum stated that Pyrrha was given her name for her red hair, and her full name is a reference to a Pyrrhic victory. She also alludes to Achilles from Homer's The Iliad.

Lie Ren

- Voiced By: Monty Oum (Volumes 1–2),^{Vol. 1 credits} Neath Oum (Volume 3–present), Apphia Yu (Young) / Soma Saito

A black-haired student at Beacon who dual wields machine pistols with attached blades, collectively called StormFlower. In Volume 7, Pietro upgraded StormFlower so the blades can be projected from the guns to act as grappling hooks.^{Vol. 7, Ch. 3} His Semblance, "Tranquility", masks negative emotion, which allows him and his targets to avoid detection from Grimm, Which was unlocked when he lost his village and family in a Grimm attack, leaving him and Nora as the only survivors.^{Vol. 4, Ch. 10}. Ren's Semblance eventually evolves, allowing him to see the emotions of those around him in the form of lotus petals with various colors.^{Vol. 8, Ch. 7 & 9} He eventually admits his feelings for Nora.^{Vol. 8, Ch. 1 & 11}

While his name in Chinese (猎人) translates to "huntsman", Ren (蓮) is also Japanese for "lotus", which is his emblem. He alludes to the legendary Chinese hero Hua Mulan.

=== Penny Polendina ===
- Voiced by: Taylor "Pelto" McNee^{Vol. 1 & Vol. 3, Ch. 5, 12, credits} / Megumi Han

An orange-haired student came to the Vytal Festival to compete in the combat tournament. She wields Floating Array: a small backpack that contains an array of gun-bladed weapons and wires. She can also use the swords as an energy beam cannon. She is known to act awkwardly around people, though she quickly becomes friends with Ruby.^{Vol. 1, Ch. 15} Penny is an android capable of generating an Aura that originally belonged to her creator, Pietro.^{Vol. 2, Ch. 4 & Vol. 7, Ch. 7} In Volume 3, during Penny's battle against Pyrrha in the Vytal Festival, Pyrrha is affected by Emerald's hallucinating Semblance, reflecting Penny's attack, causing the wires connected to her swords to tear her apart.^{Vol. 3, Ch. 9} In Volume 7, Penny is shown to have been rebuilt sometime after the Fall of Beacon and upgraded with thrusters in her feet allowing her to fly. She has become the protector of Mantle and part of Ironwood's inner circle.^{Vol. 7, Ch. 1–2} In the volume finale, while helping Winter in receiving the Winter Maiden's power, Penny ends up inheriting the Maiden's power while confronted by Cinder.^{Vol. 7, Ch. 12–13} In Volume 8, Penny is hacked by Watts through her sword stolen by the Ace-Ops and is occasionally controlled by his virus.^{Vol. 8, Ch. 3, 5 & 7–8} At the vault, Penny opens it for Team RWBY and succumbs to the virus. But her soul is separated from her robot body by Ambrosius, and she is given a human body as her old one is terminated.^{Vol. 8, Ch. 12} In the passageways to Vacuo, Penny is mortally wounded by Cinder. She lets Jaune kill her so that she can pass the Maiden's power to Winter.^{Vol. 8, Ch. 14}

Penny alludes to the character Pinocchio, hiccuping every time she tells a lie.^{Vol. 2, Ch. 3}

=== Team STRQ ===
Team STRQ (pronounced "stark") is a now-defunct team composed of Ruby and Yang's relatives, commented to have similarities to Team RWBY like being favored by Ozpin.

- Summer Rose
  Voiced by: Morgan Lauré^{Vol. 9 credits}
  The leader of Team STRQ, and the mother of Ruby and stepmother of Yang whose gravestone is frequently visited by Ruby. Her weapon was an axe-rifle hybrid.^{Vol. 9, Ch. 5 & 9} She is later revealed to be the second lover to Yang and Ruby's father, Taiyang, the first being Yang's mother, Raven. Summer wore a white hooded cloak similar to the red cloak Ruby would later wear, and she possessed silver eyes, which have devastating effects against the Grimm and passed this trait to Ruby.^{Vol. 6, Ch. 13}. Summer went on a mission but never came back which deeply affected Ruby and Taiyang. Prior to her disappearance, Yang says that she remembered Summer as a "Super Mom", able to handle being a loving parent as well as able to go on dangerous missions.^{Vol. 2, Ch. 6} Qrow tells Ruby that even Ozpin did not know the nature of Summer's last mission, with Salem revealing herself as the one who is responsible for her fate.^{Vol. 7, Ch. 4 & 11} The finale of Volume 9 reveals that Summer lied about her last mission to her family, with only Raven knowing the truth.^{Vol. 9, Ch. 10} Her full name is a reference to the poem, The Last Rose of Summer, and her gravestone has a line from the poem, "Thus kindly I scatter."^{Red Trailer}
- Taiyang Xiao Long
  Voiced by: Burnie Burns^{Vol. 3 credits} / Kenyu Horiuchi
  Yang and Ruby's widowed father, only mentioned many times in the first two Volumes before appearing out of focus seen when Ruby visits Summer's grave.^{Vol. 3, Ch. 1} He appears in the Volume 3 finale where he watches over his daughters in their home in Patch as they recover from the Battle of Beacon.^{Vol. 3, Ch. 12} Taiyang is mentioned to be a bit overprotective of both of his daughters and loves them dearly.^{Vol. 3, Ch. 12} Like Qrow, he is also a teacher at Signal.^{Vol. 3, Ch. 1} In Volume 4, Taiyang receives a bionic arm for Yang from Ironwood and encourages Yang to gradually accept the prosthesis while training her to not depend too much on her Semblance and opening up about Raven.^{Vol. 4, Ch. 3–4 & 9} His name, Taiyang (太阳), is Chinese for "sun."
- Raven Branwen
  Voiced by: Anna Hullum / Megumi Hayashibara
  The former third member of Team STRQ, the mother of Yang, the first lover of Taiyang, Qrow's older twin sister and leader of the Branwen Tribe who follows a survival of the fittest philosophy and has seized the power of the Spring Maiden for herself. Raven is armed with Omen: an ōdachi with interchangeable blades inside the sheath as her weapon of choice with her Semblance, "Kindred Link", allowing her to create a portal to whoever she has a bond with.^{Vol. 5, Ch. 4} Raven alludes to Huginn from Norse mythology.
- Qrow Branwen
  Voiced by: Vic Mignogna (Volumes 3–6), Jason Liebrecht (Volume 7–present) / Hiroaki Hirata
  A cool-headed and nonchalant former instructor at Signal Academy formerly with a heavy drinking habit, Qrow is Raven's younger twin brother, making him Yang's biological uncle and Ruby's honorary uncle. He was the fourth member of Team STRQ. Having taught Ruby to wield her Crescent Rose,^{Vol. 1, Ch. 1} his weapon, Harbinger, is a giant sword that can transform into a cannon or a scythe. Volume 6 reveals that he based Harbinger's design off of Maria's weapons because he admired her as the Grimm Reaper.^{Vol. 6, Ch. 7} His Semblance, "Misfortune", brings negative probability to those around him, and unlike other Huntsmen, his is always active and uncontrollable, with the result that he tries to fight alone so that it affects his enemies and not his comrades.^{Vol. 4, Ch. 8} Qrow was originally a part of the Branwen Tribe, he and Raven were sent into Beacon to be trained as Huntsmen to give their people an advantage against them. But Qrow renounces his kin for being killers and thieves, becoming a member of Ozpin's inner circle while given the ability to transform into a crow to serve as Ozpin's spy.^{Vol. 3, Ch. 12 & Vol. 5, Ch. 7} For the first two volumes, Qrow works as Ozpin's scout to find out about Salem's plans.^{Vol. 1, Ch. 16} Qrow alludes to Muninn from Norse mythology and is based on the Scarecrow from The Wonderful Wizard of Oz.

=== Ozma ===
- Voiced by: Aaron Dismuke and Shannon McCormick

An ancient warrior who was Salem's lover before dying from an illness. As Salem's desire to resurrect Ozma resulted in her rebellion against the gods, Ozma is brought back to life by the God of Light to lead the resurrected humanity, leading to an endless war against Salem, whom Jinn reveals that Ozma cannot kill.^{Vol. 6, Ch. 3} Every time he dies, his soul transmigrates into a new like-minded host, allowing him to take control of his host body at will while both can access each other's memories with Professor Ozpin being his current incarnation at the start of the series and referred as such before his origins are revealed.^{Vol. 5, Ch. 3} One of his past incarnations was the basis of the wizard from a story based on the creation of the first Maidens, another being a king who fought through the war.^{Vol. 5, Ch. 7} In each lifetime, he forms an inner circle to aid him. Though he is stoic and affable to those around him and can be blunt at times, he is a humble man who deeply cares for his students despite admitting to be slightly paranoid due to countless acts of betrayal he suffered across his past lives,^{Vol. 6, Ch. 1–2} a trait that he eventually came to abstain from.^{Vol. 7, Ch. 13} Ozma is named after Princess Ozma from the Oz book series, his reincarnations reference the title character of The Wonderful Wizard of Oz.

Professor Ozpin

- Voiced by: Shannon McCormick^{Vol. 1 credits} / Kazuhiko Inoue

The headmaster of Beacon Academy and the latest reincarnation of Ozma, armed with a cane, The Long Memory, which has numerous functions that include serving as a melee weapon capable of generating a protective force field.^{Vol. 3, Ch. 12} The cane has vast amount of powerful kinetic energy stored inside, accumulated by Ozpin during his past lifetimes.^{Vol. 8, Ch. 10}

Oscar Pine

- Voiced by: Aaron Dismuke^{Vol. 4 credits} / Rie Kugimiya

A young farm boy who lived with his aunt before becoming Ozpin's new host and joining his students.

He is believed to allude to Tippetarius, or the disguised form of Princess Ozma from The Marvelous Land of Oz

=== Maria Calavera ===
- Voiced by: Melissa Sternenberg

An elderly woman with prosthetic eyes, though she cannot see color with them.^{Vol. 6, Ch. 6} She was originally a silver-eyed Huntress known as the Grimm Reaper before being blinded by the Faunus assassin Tock. Maria received her prosthetic eyes from Pietro, and they have been close friends ever since.^{Vol. 7, Ch. 1} The cane she uses was one of her two kamas, Life and Death, that combine at the ends to form a twin-bladed weapon.^{Vol. 6, Ch. 7} Her Semblance, which she calls "Preflexes", allows her to react to attacks almost before they happen. Unlike most Hunters, due to the risk of being targeted by Salem, Maria was trained by her father instead of attending a school.^{Vol. 6, Ch. 8} She meets Team RWBY, Qrow and Oscar after they crash-land into the snow region of northern Anima.^{Vol. 6, Ch. 1} Upon learning that Ruby has silver eyes, Maria teaches her to consciously use her powers when they are attacked by the Apathy Grimm.^{Vol. 6, Ch. 6} In Argus, she becomes a mentor to Ruby and shares what she knows about the silver eyes.^{Vol. 6, Ch. 8}

She alludes to the typical image of the Grim Reaper in popular culture, and her last name means "skull" in Spanish.

=== Emerald Sustrai ===
- Voiced by: Katie Newville / Marina Inoue

A light green-haired girl with dark skin who was an associate of Cinder's and uses Thief's Respite, a pair of pistols with attached blades that can also extend via chains, similar to a kusarigama. Her Semblance, "Hallucinations", allows her to cast hallucinations on people's minds, advantageous for her thieving skills, though it becomes a strain to her if she tries to do it on more than one person.^{Vol. 3, Ch. 7} By the time of Volume 8, Emerald has trained in improving her Semblance, as she can cast hallucinations on multiple people and keep them for an extended period of time.^{Vol. 8, Ch. 9} Ever since she was recruited by Cinder, Emerald had an undying loyalty to her, even if she serves someone as evil as Salem.^{Vol. 5, Ch. 11} But after she learns of Salem's true goals and is nearly killed by the witch, Emerald defects to Ruby's group.^{Vol. 8, Ch. 7 & 9-11}

She alludes to Aladdin from the classic anthology book One Thousand and One Nights.

== Kingdoms ==
=== Vale ===
==== Beacon Academy ====
- Glynda Goodwitch
  Voiced by: Kathleen Zuelch (Volumes 1–3)^{Vol. 1 credits}, Tiana Camacho (Ice Queendom, Justice League X RWBY: Super Heroes and Huntsmen, Part One) / Masumi Asano: A Huntress and teacher at Beacon Academy^{Vol. 1} who wields a riding crop, The Disciplinarian, as her weapon, in a similar fashion as a magic wand, and whose Semblance is "Telekinesis". With her Semblance, not only can she control objects, but can also repair those which were broken before. She mostly teaches combat classes, tends to be more stern and strict with her students, and is apparently behind only Ozpin in rank at Beacon. In Volume 4, Port and Oobleck reveal that Goodwitch is working to restore Beacon to its former glory. ^{Vol. 4, Ch. 4} Her name is derived from the character Glinda the Good Witch of The Wonderful Wizard of Oz.
- Professor Peter Port
  Voiced by: Ryan Haywood (Volumes 1–4)^{Vol. 1 credits} / Anthony Sardinha (Grimm Eclipse, Ice Queendom–present) / Soichi Abe: A veteran Huntsman and teacher at Beacon Academy, and is an expert on fighting different creatures of Grimm. His weapon, Blowhard, is a blunderbuss that has axe blades attached to the stock. In Volume 1, Port tells Weiss to be more humble and support Ruby as a teammate. ^{Vol. 1, Ch. 10} In Volume 4, it is Port who tells Yang that she needs to handle her fears. It is also shown that he is afraid of mice.^{Vol. 4, Ch. 4} His name and his tale of taking on a Beowolf in his youth allude to Peter and the Wolf.
- Dr. Bartholomew Oobleck
  Voiced by: Joel Heyman ^{Vol. 1 credits} / Yuichi Karasuma: A teacher at Beacon Academy, teaching Remnant history. His weapon of choice is Antiquity's Roast, a thermos (from which he drinks coffee out of) that can also transform into a flamethrower. He frequently sips coffee and moves around and speaks at an extremely accelerated rate. Despite his bumbling nature, he is actually very wise and knowledgeable, choosing to learn from mankind's past mistakes so that they won't happen again in the future. Unlike other Huntsmen who fight, Oobleck chooses to defend people by passing his knowledge on to other Huntsmen and Huntresses. He believes that knowledge is the most powerful weapon from all of them.^{Vol. 2, Ch. 9} He is named after the children's book Bartholomew and the Oobleck by Dr. Seuss.

Team CRDL

Team CRDL (pronounced "cardinal") is formed as another first-year team at Beacon Academy, alongside RWBY and JNPR.^{Vol. 1, Ch. 8} The team's members have a gray and brown color scheme and are named after birds.

- Cardin Winchester
  Voiced by: Adam Ellis ^{Vol. 1 credits} / Subaru Kimura: A burnt orange-haired student and the leader of Team CRDL. He wears silver-gray armor and wields a giant mace called The Executioner. Cardin has a reputation as a bully, he and the rest of his team are shown to be picking on several fellow students. After he finds out that Jaune Arc faked his application to Beacon, he is briefly able to manipulate him into doing his bidding. He also, alongside the rest of his team, bullies Velvet Scarlatina because of her being a Faunus.^{Vol. 1, Ch. 11–14} Cardin alludes to the Cardinal of Winchester who presided over the Trial of Joan of Arc.
- Russel Thrush
  Voiced by: Shane Newville ^{Vol. 1 credits} / Jun Miyamoto: A green-haired student who wields a pair of Dust-daggers, Shortwings, as a shout out to Will Scarlet.
- Dove Bronzewing:
  A light brown-haired student who fights with a long sword called Hallshott that can fire bullets.
- Sky Lark:
  A dark blue-haired student whose weapon is a halberd called Feather's Edge.

Team CFVY

Team CFVY (pronounced "coffee") consists of second-year Beacon Academy students. They transferred to Shade Academy in Vacuo following the Fall of Beacon and are the main protagonists of RWBY: After the Fall and Before the Dawn. The team's members have a red and brown color scheme and are named after desserts.

- Coco Adel
  Voiced by: Ashley Jenkins / Shizuka Itō: A fashionably dressed girl with military-themed accessories, who wields her weapon Gianduja, a briefcase that transforms into a minigun. Its destructive power is magnified due to her "Hype" Semblance, allowing her Aura to enhance the effect and power of anything Dust-based. Her name is derived from Cocoa, theorized to be based on Coco Chanel.
- Fox Alistair
  A young, black, blind man who was an orphan living in Vacuo before attending Beacon, wearing an orange vest and armed with his weapon Sharp Retribution, a pair of wrist-mounted blades. His Semblance is "Telepathy", which allows him to compensate for his blindness while allowing him to communicate with his teammates. His name is derived from fox hunter pie, as well as the story of The Fox and the Hound.
- Velvet Scarlatina
  Voiced by: Caiti Ward ^{Vol. 1 credits} / Megumi Han: A brown-haired rabbit Faunus at Beacon Academy. Monty has described her combat style to be very mage-like, along with being very agile. Her weapon, Anesidora, is a camera that she uses to take pictures of other students' weapons, which allows her to conjure holographic copies of their weapons, but can only be used once per picture. She uses her weapon in conjunction with her Semblance, "Photographic Memory", which allows her to mimic other people's moves. Rooster Teeth held a fan contest to design her combat uniform, the result of which was announced on March 6, 2014. Her name is derived from The Velveteen Rabbit and red velvet cake.
- Yatsuhashi Daichi
  Voiced by: Joe MacDonald / Ryōsuke Morita: The final member of team CFVY, Yatsuhashi is a tall male in a green one-sleeved robe armed with Fulcrum, a long sword. His Semblance, "Memory Wiping", allows him to erase a person's memories when he touches them, trivial memories permanently lost while the timing that important ones are later recalled within a duration of time equal to how long Yatsuhashi was touching that person. His name comes from the Japanese treat of the same name, and his name was revealed in a series of tweets of the treat by Monty culminating in a singular image of Yatsuhashi Kengyo along with the phrase "You'll figure it out".

==== Shion Zaiden ====
- Voiced by: Kdin Jenzen / Hiroki Nanami

An original character in Ice Queendom, which takes place between Volumes 1 and 2 of the series. They are a special type of Huntsman called a "Nightmare Hunter", armed with a dreamcatcher-like weapon that helps with capturing Nightmare Grimm. Shion arrives to Beacon during the Team RWBY's initiation test in the Emerald Forest due to a Nightmare possessing Jaune, offering their help when Weiss is attacked by another Nightmare.

=== Mistral ===
==== Haven Academy ====
Professor Leonardo Lionheart
Voiced by: Daman Mills: A lion Faunus with a tail who was the headmaster of Haven Academy, armed with wrist-mounted shield named Stalwart that fires combined Dust projectiles. While originally a member of Ozpin's inner circle, Lionheart betrayed them as he allied himself with Salem's faction out of fear.^{Vol. 4, Ch. 12} Lionheart was killed by Salem's Seer Grimm after trying to flee when the tide of the battle of Haven turned against Salem's faction.^{Vol. 5, Ch. 14}

He is based on the Cowardly Lion in The Wonderful Wizard of Oz.

Team SSSN

Each member of Team SSSN (pronounced "sun") has a Big Bang motif. They transferred to Shade after Lionheart's death and serve as the main protagonists of the novel RWBY: Before the Dawn alongside Team CFVY.

- Sun Wukong
  Voiced by: Michael Jones^{Vol. 1 credits} / Tomoaki Maeno: A blond-haired monkey Faunus. His weapon, Ruyi Bang and Jingu Bang, is a collapsible bō staff that splits into two nunchaku that can also function as sawed-off shotguns (sometimes referred to as "gunchucks"). With his Semblance, "Via Sun", he can create astral projection clones of himself in battle. He possesses great speed and agility from his monkey-like traits and seems to be able to see through disguises, as he noticed Blake's Faunus heritage despite her bow.^{Vol. 1, Ch. 15} Even though he attends the academy in Mistral, he's actually a native of Vacuo.^{Vol. 3, Ch. 2} He lost his parents at a young age, unable to remember their faces. His only family left is his cousin, Starr Sanzang. Sun would serve as Blake's voice of comfort until they eventually parted ways. Sun alludes to the character of the same name from Journey to the West.
- Scarlet David
  Voiced by: Gavin Free: A red-haired young man with a cape who wields Hook and Darling, a flintlock pistol and a cutlass, as his weapons of choice. The handle of the pistol can be fired as a grappling hook. His Semblance is "Gliding", which allows him to maneuver in the air and land safely. In the Before the Dawn novel, Scarlet is at odds with Sun due to his leader's constant abandonment of the team. He also enters into a relationship with Nolan. Scarlet alludes to Peter Pan, specifically from Peter Pan in Scarlet. His outfit is an allusion to G-Dragon of Big Bang.
- Sage Ayana
  Voiced by: Josh Ornelas: A green-haired and dark-skinned young man with tattoos and a long coat, and wields Pilgrim, a large sword with Roman numerals on it. In Before the Dawn, he, like Scarlet, is frustrated with Sun going off on his own, resulting in him giving his leader the silent treatment. During Shade Academy's re-initiation, he is made leader of Team SSEA, though is not a good team leader according to Scarlet. Sage alludes to one of the fables by Aesop, though the exact character and tale are unknown. It is believed that he is based on The Pilgrim and the Sword. His outfit is an allusion to Taeyang of BigBang.
- Neptune Vasilias
  Voiced by: Kerry Shawcross / Yoshiki Nakajima: A blue-haired man with goggles who has a large rifle that fires electricity and can turn into a guandao and Trident named Tri-Hard (as per Sun's suggestion). Although he has a cool image, he is unable to dance, which is a source of embarrassment for him,^{Vol. 2, Ch. 7} and has an intense fear of water.^{Vol. 3, Ch. 2} His fear of water comes from an accident as a child involving his water controlling Semblance, "Water Attraction", in which he nearly drowned himself and his older brother, Jupiter. Neptune alludes to the Roman sea god of the same name. His appearance and outfit is styled after BigBang member T.O.P.

Team ABRN

Team ABRN (pronounced "auburn") fights Team RWBY in the team round of the Vytal Festival Tournament.^{Vol. 3, Ch. 1} Its members are among the group of students that fights off Grimm and Atlas mechs during the Battle of Beacon.^{Vol. 3, Ch. 10–11} In Before the Dawn, they have transferred to Shade Academy following Lionheart's death.

- Arslan Altan
  Voiced by: Ami Naito: A dark-skinned young woman who is capable of hand-to-hand combat and wields a rope javelin.
- Bolin Hori
  Voiced by: Jon Risinger / Ryōsuke Morita: A black-haired young man who wields a staff that could turn into a scythe and boomerang.
- Reese Chloris
  Voiced by: Erin Winn / Chisato Mori: A light green-haired girl who rides a hoverboard that absorbs Dust crystals and transforms into dual pistols.
- Nadir Shiko
  Voiced by: Eiji Takeuchi: A pink-haired teenage boy who wields an assault rifle that can also transform into a sword.

==== Team SAFR ====
Team SAFR (pronounced "sapphire") are the main protagonists of RWBY: The Grimm Campaign. Two years prior to the events of the main series, the team was assigned by Qrow Branwen to investigate the rise of Grimm and criminal organizations in the Mistral city of Kuchinashi.

- Arrastra Skye
  Voiced by: Laura Yates: A blue-haired cat Faunus. Her weapon, Windlass, is a large pickaxe which can convert into a crossbow form. Her Semblance, "Equilibrium", allows her to restore the Aura of a willing ally through Dust, though the receiver will suffer from side effects.
- Asher Mora
  Voiced by: Chad James: A grey-haired man who wields Fortune's Fangs, a hawkbill knife and hook that can extend into a glaive. His Semblance, "Flash", allows him to release a bright light from his body that blinds others within the vicinity and damages Grimm.
- Fenix Nemean
  Voiced by: Chris Kokkinos: A red-haired lion Faunus. his weapon, Pandora's Aegis, is a pair of bronze, arm-mounted brass claws which can convert into arm-mounted shields. His Semblance, "Beast Mode", turns him berserk and increases his physical capabilities, but can be reverted through various ways.
- Pyke Rite
  Voiced by: Kerry Shawcross: A brown-haired man who wields Rasen, a drill cannon mounted on his right hand. His Semblance, "Fate's Hand", has him ask fate for the best way to handle a situation, and hoping for the best. Sometimes it improves outcomes, but other times it can make outcomes worse.

==== Branwen Tribe ====
Vernal

- Voiced by: Amber Lee Connors

Raven's right-hand woman and decoy for the title of the Spring Maiden. Her weapons are a pair of wind and fire wheels with guns attached inside. In her debut in Volume 5, Vernal tells Weiss that the tribe is planning on using her as a ransom for Jacques, and that her older sister has returned to Atlas.^{Vol. 5, Ch. 3} Later on during the Battle of Haven, she engages Weiss in combat as per Raven's orders, and easily defeats her.^{Vol. 5, Ch. 11} At the vault of the Relic of Knowledge, Vernal is impaled and killed by Cinder for the Maiden's power, only for her to be exposed as a decoy for Raven.^{Vol. 5, Ch. 12–13}

Shay D. Mann

- Voiced by: Clifford Chapin

A bandit from Raven's tribe whom Yang brutally punched at a gas station where he harasses her while drunk, leading her to the camp with the intend to rob her before he and his aid are defeated and learning Yang is Raven's daughter.^{Vol. 5, Ch. 1 & 4} Later, while guarding the camp gates, he is confronted by Cinder's faction and Watts.^{Vol. 5, Ch. 7} His name is a play on the phrase "shady man".

=== Atlas ===
==== Atlesian Military ====
General James Ironwood

- Voiced by: Jason Rose / Masaki Terasoma

Headmaster of Atlas Academy and a renowned military leader, also being a member of Ozpin's inner circle despite disagreeing with him over using military force to handle threats head-on. According to Glynda, he tends to take his work with him wherever he goes. His weapons, collectively called Due Process, are a pair of revolvers that can be attached to a cannon.^{Vol. 8, Ch. 12} His Semblance, "Mettle", enables him to hyper-focus and carry through with whatever decision he makes. In Volume 3, it is revealed that Ironwood has a robotic right arm, torso and leg.^{Vol. 3, Ch. 11} Ironwood decided to take the war against Salem into his own hands after the fall of Beacon, but the stress combined with his paranoia slowly drove his allies and followers away and he was left to die in the fall of Atlas.^{Vol. 8, Ch. 14} Ironwood alludes to the Tin Woodman from The Wonderful Wizard of Oz.

Winter Schnee

- Voiced by: Elizabeth Maxwell / Ayako Kawasumi

Weiss' elder sister and Ironwood's right hand in the military, armed with a saber with a detachable estoc. Like Weiss, having left the Schnee family to make a difference, Winter inherited their family's "Glyphs" Semblance, which she fully mastered to easily summon constructs modeled after defeated Grimm. While dignified and distant, Winter deeply cares for Weiss and is ill-tempered, as shown when Qrow insulted the Atlas military while provoking her to fight him.^{Vol. 3 Ch. 3} During the fall of Atlas, Penny passed the Winter Maiden's power to her.^{Vol. 8 Ch. 14}

Winter is possibly an allusion to The Snow Queen.

Caroline Cordovin

- Voiced by: Mela Lee

The special operative in charge in Argus. Cordovin is a prideful and arrogant woman who looks down on all non-Atlesians, and is emotionally unstable, especially when provoked. Upon meeting the group of heroes, she refuses to allow any of them to go to Atlas, except for Weiss. She also has a bad history with Maria.^{Vol. 6, Ch. 8} When the group tries to steal a military airship, Cordovin overreacts by piloting a giant mech called the Colossus to attack them but ultimately loses after Ruby destroys the mech's cannon, she ultimately lets the heroes leave for Atlas after they helped defend the city against the Grimm.^{Vol. 6, Ch. 10–12}

Cordovin alludes to the nursery rhyme, "There was an Old Woman Who Lived in a Shoe".

Dr. Pietro Polendina

- Voiced by: Dave Fennoy

An elderly Atlesian scientist who traverses with a mechanic wheelchair, and is responsible for the creation of Penny, Yang's robotic arm, and Maria's cybernetic eyes. Maria visits him roughly every ten years to have her implants adjusted.^{Vol. 7, Ch. 1} With Penny's creation, Pietro gave her a huge portion of his Aura. He cherishes Penny as his own daughter but is overprotective of her, so much that he is against letting her going into harm's way to achieve a goal.^{Vol. 8, Ch. 5}

Pietro is an allusion to Geppetto from Pinocchio.

Ace-Ops

The Ace-Ops are a special team of Huntsmen in the Atlas Military. Like Winter and Penny, they are part of Ironwood's inner circle.^{Vol. 7, Ch. 2} In Volume 8, The Ace-Ops are led by Winter following Clover's death.^{Vol. 8, Ch. 5} Each member is an allusion to one of the Aesop's Fables, with the team's name being a homophone of the word 'Aesop'.

- Clover Ebi
  Voiced by: Chris Wehkamp: Leader of the Ace-Ops who wields an extendable fishing pole called Kingfisher. His Semblance is good fortune.^{Vol. 7, Ch. 3} Clover develops a friendship with Qrow, and seems to have had a past relationship with Robyn.^{Vol. 7, Ch. 3 & 5} Clover is killed by Tyrian.^{Vol. 7, Ch. 12}
- Elm Ederne
  Voiced by: Dawn M. Bennett: A muscular woman who wields a giant hammer, Timber, that doubles as a rocket launcher. Her Semblance allows her to use her Aura to root her feet into the ground.^{Vol. 7, Ch. 3}
- Marrow Amin
  Voiced by: Mick Lauer: A dog Faunus who wields Fetch, a machine gun that can extend into a bladed boomerang. His Semblance can freeze specific targets by uttering the word "stay".^{Vol. 7, Ch. 3}
- Harriet Bree
  Voiced by: Anairis Quiñones: A woman with a mohawk who wields exoskeletal gauntlets called Fast Knuckles. Her Semblance allows her to move super fast, and she notes that her reaction time is quicker than Ruby's.^{Vol. 7, Ch. 3} Although she trusts her fellow Ace-Ops, Harriet only sees her team as coworkers and not as friends.^{Vol. 7, Ch. 4}.
- Vine Zeki
  Voiced by: Todd Womack: A pale man with unique forehead tattoos and wields Thorn, a giant shuriken-like weapon. His Semblance allows him to create extendable arms and legs.^{Vol. 7, Ch. 3 & 12} Vine sacrificed himself to protect his team from the bomb that was meant for Mantle.^{Vol. 8, Ch. 14}

==== Atlas Academy ====
Penny's team

- Ciel Soleil
  Voiced by: Yssa Badiola / Ami Naito: A dark-skinned girl with a beret who serves as Penny's handler while being unaware of her being an android.^{Vol. 3, Ch. 5}

Team FNKI

Team FNKI (pronounced "funky") is a team participating in the Vytal Tournament. Weiss and Yang take on two of their members during the doubles rounds and the two fight during the Battle of Beacon. The other two members are introduced when Team FNKI returns in Volume 7. In Volume 8, Team FNKI is sent to the front lines during the Battle of Atlas. ^{Vol. 8, Ch. 9}

- Flynt Coal
  Voiced by: Flynt Flossy / Tooru Sakurai: A dark-skinned boy with a fedora hat who wields a trumpet that can release sound waves to disorient his opponents. His Semblance creates the "Killer Quartet", in which he generates three clones of himself, each wearing a different colored necktie and armed with a trumpet. He initially hated Weiss because her family put his father out of business, but later respects her when she risks her own safety for her team's victory.
- Neon Katt
  Voiced by: Meg Turney / Konomi Fujimura: A talkative cat Faunus girl with roller skates who wields a glowstick-like nunchaku. Her name is derived from the internet meme Nyan Cat, and she creates a rainbow trail as she skates. ^{Vol. 3, Ch. 5}
- Kobalt
  A tall man with long blue hair. He and Ivori allude to the dress, with Kobalt being the black/blue version.
- Ivori
  A grey-haired and tan-skinned man with glasses who uses a whip. He and Kobalt allude to the dress, with Ivori being the gold/white version.

==== Happy Huntresses ====
The Happy Huntresses are composed of Atlas Academy graduates who did not join the military, and instead use their talents to serve Mantle.^{Vol. 7, Ch. 2} They refer to the Merry Men.

- Robyn Hill
  Voiced by: Cristina Vee: Leader of the Happy Huntresses and a Mantle politician who is going against Jacques in the council election of Atlas.^{Vol. 7, Ch. 2} Her weapon is a wrist-mounted crossbow with bladed fans that act as a shield, and her Semblance acts as a lie detector when she physically holds someone's hand.^{Vol. 7, Ch. 7} She seems to have a history with Clover. In her Volume 7 debut, Robyn confronts Clover about Ironwood using vital supplies for his plans with Amity Arena, instead of reinforcing Mantle's defenses.^{Vol. 7, Ch. 5}
- Fiona Thyme
  Voiced by: Michele Sontag: A short sheep Faunus. Her Semblance, "Pocket Dimensions", allows her to teleport objects by touching them.^{Vol. 7, Ch. 7}
- Joanna Greenleaf
  Voiced by: Marissa Lenti: A tall tanned woman with short dark-green hair and a muscular build.
- May Marigold
  Voiced by: Kdin Jenzen (Volumes 7–8): A blue-haired transgender woman. Her Semblance enables her to create an illusionary force field, preventing those outside to see what is happening on the inside.^{Vol. 7, Ch. 7} Originally part of the upperclass from Atlas, May was disowned by her own family for supporting Mantle.^{Vol. 8, Ch. 7}

==== Schnee Household ====
- Nicholas Schnee
  Voiced by: John Swasey / Ken Uo: The deceased father of Willow, and the grandfather of Winter, Weiss, and Whitley, and the founder of the SDC. Nicholas is an allusion to Santa Claus.
- Willow Schnee
  Voiced by: Caitlin Glass / Gara Takashima: The abused, depressed wife of Jacques, the daughter of Nicholas, and the mother of Winter, Weiss, and Whitley. Like her daughters, Willow has the family Semblance of "Glyphs".^{Vol. 8, Ch. 8} She has been an alcoholic since learning that Jacques only married her for the Schnee family name and wealth.^{Vol. 5, Ch. 8} In Volume 7, Willow reveals to Weiss that she placed hidden cameras throughout the Schnee manor to spy on Jacques, pleading with her daughter not to abandon Whitley despite siding with their father.^{Vol. 7, Ch. 8}
- Whitley Schnee
  Voiced by: Howard Wang / Marina Inoue: The son of Jacques and Willow, and the younger brother of Weiss and Winter, an arrogant youth who considers his older sisters' career choices as pointless and barbaric.^{Vol. 4, Ch. 9} Despite his dislike of his sisters for abandoning him with their parents, he eventually reconciles with them.
- Klein Sieben
  Voiced by: J. Michael Tatum^{Vol. 4, Ch. 2 credits} / Ken Uo: The Schnee family butler, Klein is supportive of Weiss and is shown to deeply care for her. ^{Vol. 4, Ch. 2} Klein eventually helps Weiss escape from Schnee manor near the end of Volume 4, revealed in Volume 7 to have been fired as a result,^{Vol. 4, Ch. 11 & Vol. 7, Ch. 8} but returns on Whitley's request to nurse Nora.^{Vol. 8, Ch. 7} His full name which is German for "small seven" and his mood swings allude to the seven dwarves from Snow White.

==== Arrowfell ====
Team BRIR

Team BRIR (pronounced "briar") is a team active in Atlas, but are not native to the kingdom. They serve as guardians of the Fort Arrowfell in RWBY: Arrowfell, which is set sometime after the beginning of Volume 7.

- Bianca Prisma
  Voiced by: Alexis Tipton: A blonde haired woman who wields twin prism daggers called Cause and Effect. Her Semblance, "Refraction", can copy other people's Semblances.
- Roane Ashwood
  Voiced by: Laura Stahl: A dark-skinned woman with red dreadlocks who wields Drop and Roll, a flamethrower that doubles as a flail. Her Semblance, "Inferno", enhances her weapon's attacks.
- Ivy Thickety
  Voiced by: Amanda Lee: A brunette-haired woman who wields a thorn-barbed whip called Pins and Needles. Her Semblance, "Threshold", can create portals that she uses in conjunction with her weapon.
- Ruda Tilleroot
  Voiced by: Judy Alice Lee: A ginger-haired woman who wields a pair of drill gauntlets called Wear and Tear. Her Semblance, "Delve", allows her to "swim" underground.

Bram Thornmane

- Voiced by: Yong Yea

Bram Thormane was introduced as the guardian of a small village in Mantle in the video game, RWBY: Arrowfell. His weapon is a bow that can be split into two daggers. Bram trained under Ironwood to become a member of the Ace-Ops, but was ultimately rejected by the general and harbors a grudge for his former teacher. Bram worked behind the scenes as the head of a conspiracy to use Arrowfell technology and overthrow Ironwood. But he was eventually defeated by Team RWBY and was arrested by Ironwood. With the fall of Atlas, Bram's fate is currently unknown.

Olive Harper

- Voiced by: Skye LaFontaine

Olive Harper is a Lieutenant Colonel in the Atlas military and serves as Thormane's spy on Ironwood. She was tricked by Bram into helping him usurp Ironwood, who made her believe things will get better that way. Near the end of Arrowfell, Olive admits her crimes to Team RWBY and willingly turns herself in. With the fall of Atlas, Olive's fate is currently unknown.

Amoncio Glass

- Voiced by: Lucas Schuneman

An Atlas elite and mob boss involved in many shady businesses and is provided with Arrowfell technology for personal profit.

Hanlon Fifestone

- Voiced by: Major Attaway

A respected Mantle Union leader prior to the events of RWBY Arrowfell. His Semblance enables him to extract raw emotions from people, he was hired by Bram Thornmane to help him get his revenge on Ironwood against his will.

=== Vacuo ===
==== Shade Academy ====
Professor Theodore

The headmaster of Shade Academy who is first mentioned in the novel RWBY: After the Fall. He is a genderbent allusion to Dorothy from the Wizard of Oz.

Professor Xanthe Rumpole

The history teacher of Shade Academy and Theodore's right-hand woman. Her Semblance allows her to touch any non-living object and turn it to gold in an instant. In Before the Dawn, Rumpole secretly allows Team CFVY to investigate The Crown. She is an allusion to Rumpelstiltsken.

Team BRNZ

Team BRNZ (pronounced "bronze") fights Team JNPR in the first (team) round of the Vytal Festival Tournament.^{Vol. 3, Ch. 2} In Before the Dawn, it is revealed that Nolan is the sole survivor of his team after the fall of Beacon.

- Brawnz Ni
  Voiced by: Blaine Gibson / Ryuichi Kijima: A black-haired man with gray highlights who wields a pair of claws.
- Roy Stallion
  Voiced by: Atsushi Miyamoto: A dark-skinned male with dreadlocks who wears gauntlets capable of firing circular saw blades.
- Nolan Porfirio
  Voiced by: Aaron Marquis: A maroon-haired man who wields an electrically charged cattle prod. In Before the Dawn, it was revealed he had romantic feelings for Roy, and later entered into a relationship with Scarlet. He is intended as the "Lost Boy" to Scarlet's Peter Pan.
- May Zedong
  A beanie-wearing female who wields a sniper rifle with a blade on the underside of the stock.

Team NDGO

Team NDGO (pronounced "indigo") fights Team SSSN in the first (team) round of the Vytal Festival Tournament. ^{Vol. 3, Ch. 2} The characters are based on fans who were Indiegogo backers for the movie Lazer Team. In Before the Dawn, they act the most antagonistic towards the other transfer student teams from Beacon and Haven.

- Nebula Violette
  Voiced by: Kate Warner: A purple-haired girl who wields a crossbow that can transform into a sword.
- Dew Gayl
  Voiced by: Kim Newman / Chisato Mori: A blonde-haired girl who wields a spear capable of creating tornadoes.
- Gwen Darcy
  Voiced by: Mylissa Zelechowski / Konomi Fujimura: A black-haired girl who wields throwing knives that she keeps in her armored skirt.
- Octavia Ember
  Voiced by: Claire Hogan: A red-haired girl who wields a kris sword that can release fire torrents. Her Semblance is called "Sand Skating", which allows her to traverse sandy environments at high speeds.

Temporary Teams

In Before the Dawn, Theodore forms temporary teams that are mixes of Shade, Beacon, and Haven academy students.

- Team BYRN (pronounced "burn"): Bolin Hori, Yatsuhashi Daichi, Rae Noire, and Neptune Vasilias.
- Team FNDU (pronounced "fondue"): Fox Alistair, Nolan Porfirio, Dew Gayl, and Umber Gorgoneion who willingly follows the Crown.
- Team NOVA ("nova"): Nebula Violette, Octavia Ember, Velvet Scarlatina, and Arslan Altan.
- Team ROSC (pronounced "rosy"): Reese Chloris, Olive Gashley, Scarlet David, and Coco Adel.
- Team SSEA (pronounced "sea"): Sage Ayana, Sun Wukong, Elektra Fury, and Ariadne Guimet.

=== Menagerie ===
- Ghira Belladonna
  Voiced by: Kent Williams / Masafumi Kimura: Blake's father, and chieftain of Menagerie. His Faunus trait is his retractable panther claws at his fingertips.^{Vol. 5, Ch. 8} He originally served as leader of the White Fang before stepping down.
- Kali Belladonna
  Voiced by: Tara Platt / Megumi Toyoguchi: Ghira's wife and Blake's mother. Like her daughter, Kali has cat ears.
- Ilia Amitola
  Voiced by: Cherami Leigh / Mariya Ise: A chameleon Faunus who is an old acquaintance of Blake's, able to change her skin tone and eye color at will. She wields Lightning Lash, a rapier-like weapon that doubles as a whip that can give off an electrical charge.

=== Citizens ===
- Zwei
  Ruby and Yang's pet Pembroke Welsh Corgi. He only makes a few appearances in the main RWBY series but is featured more extensively in the RWBY Chibi series. In Volume 2, Zwei is sent to Ruby and Yang by Taiyang via mail to be taken care of. ^{Vol. 2, Ch. 8} After Ruby sneaks the dog on her team's assignment, he helps them and Oobleck fighting Torchwick and the White Fang.^{Vol. 2, Ch. 9 & 11} Zwei returns to the family home in Patch following the Fall of Beacon. ^{Vol. 4} His name is a play on the corgi Ein from the manga/anime series Cowboy Bebop.
- Shopkeep
  Voiced by: Patrick Rodriguez^{Vol. 1 credits}: A shop owner of various places such as From Dust Till Dawn.^{Vol. 1, Ch. 1} He is often seen being robbed or his property damaged.^{Vol. 1} In Volumes 2 and 3, he operates a noodle stand on the Vytal Festival grounds. ^{Vol. 2, Ch. 4 & Vol. 3, Ch. 1} Shopkeep survives the Fall of Beacon and watches Ruby's broadcast to the world with Goodwitch in Volume 8. ^{Vol. 8, Ch. 5}
- Tukson
  Voiced by: Adam Ellis^{Vol. 2 credits} / Kenta Miyake: A puma Faunus with finger claws who was a former White Fang member before deserting them to open a book shop in Vale. He planned on fleeing to Vacuo, but was killed by Mercury and Emerald. ^{Vol. 2, Ch. 1}
- Jaune's Great-Great Grandfather
  Jaune's ancestor who fought in the Great War, and the original wielder of Crocea Mors.^{Vol. 1, Ch. 2}
- Saphron Cotta-Arc
  Voiced by: Lindsay Sheppard: Jaune's elder sister who is currently living in Argus with her wife Terra and their son Adrian. She is the only daughter of the family to have moved out.^{Vol. 6, Ch. 7} She helps her brother's group by having Adrian distract the military base with his cries.^{Vol. 6, Ch. 10} She is based on Sappho of Lesbos.
- Terra Cotta-Arc
  Voiced by: Jamie Smith: Saphron's wife and Adrian's mother. She works as a technician at the city of Argus' relay tower, though she has been falsely blamed for technical troubles.^{Vol. 6, Ch. 7} Terra guides Blake on how to disable the tower's radar when the group tries to steal an airship.^{Vol. 6, Ch. 10}
- Adrian Cotta-Arc
  Voiced by: Lucella Wren Clary: Saphron and Terra's son, and Jaune's nephew.^{Vol. 6, Ch. 7} His cries are capable of delivering powerful sound waves.^{Vol. 6, Ch. 10}
- Li and An Ren
  Voiced by: Kaiji Tang / Yoji Ueda and Dawn M. Bennett / Azusa Tanaka: The late parents of Lie Ren. They lived in Kuroyuri with their son, and Li was an archer. They were both killed when Grimm destroyed the town. ^{Vol. 4, Ch. 10}
- Henry Marigold
  Voiced by: Alejandro Saab: An Atlesian citizen who is May Marigold's cousin. In Volume 4, he attends the Schnee charity event without understanding its purpose. ^{Vol. 4, Ch. 6}
- Forest
  Voiced by: Eric Baudor: An avid supporter of Robyn. He is arrested for throwing a brick at a military airship. While on the ship with the heroes, Forest reveals to them about Robyn's campaign.^{Vol. 7, Ch. 2} After he is dropped off by the police, Forest is killed by Tyrian.^{Vol. 7, Ch. 3}
- Sleet and Camilla
  Voiced by: Chad James and Anairis Quinones: Two members of the Atlas council. They first appear at Jacques' dinner party to interrogate Ironwood over his recent actions. When Weiss exposes Jacques' secret meeting with Watts, both Sleet and Camilla recognize the mad doctor and learn about Salem's existence from Ironwood.^{Vol. 7, Ch. 8–9} In Volume 8, Sleet is killed by Ironwood for protesting.^{Vol. 8, Ch. 1}
- Rhodes
  Voiced by: Christian Young: A Huntsman who uses a pair of maces and swords, with the former having guns at the top. His Semblance turns his skin into metal to reduce the effect of blunt and cut trauma, he became Cinder's mentor out of pity but was killed by her.^{Vol. 8, Ch. 7}
- Madame and Cinder's Stepsisters
  Voiced by: Linda Leonard and Amanda Lee: The stepfamily of Cinder. The mother was the owner of the Glass Unicorn in Atlas. After adopting Cinder, the mother subjugated her stepdaughter to a life of slavery and allowed her daughters to torment her. Years later, after the daughters discovered Cinder's sword in her room, the whole family is mercilessly killed by her. They allude to the stepfamily of Cinderella.^{Vol. 8, Ch. 6}
- Starr Sanzang
  Sun's elder cousin who lives in Vacuo. She runs a dojo. She witnessed Sun unlocking his Semblance when he was younger.
- Slate
  The mayor of Tuff settlement whom with the help of team CFVY took her people safely to Vacuo.
- Rolf
  Voiced by: David Errigo Jr.: A security guard of Blake's parents in Menagerie who appears in the simulation of Remnant in Justice League x RWBY: Super Heroes & Huntsmen.

== Antagonists ==
=== Salem's Inner Circle ===
==== Salem ====
- Voiced by: Jen Taylor^{Vol. 1 credits}, Natalie Van Sistine (Paladins: Champions of the Realm) / Kikuko Inoue

Known as the Mysterious Narrator prior to her formal introduction, Salem was a human who rebelled against the gods for not reviving her beloved Ozma and cursing her with immortality. Seeking death, Salem jumped into a Grimm pit which turned her into a human-Grimm hybrid.^{Vol. 6, Ch. 3} It is now assumed that she seeks to divide humanity and turn them against each other so the gods would deem them unworthy when summoned back with the Relics and wipe them out, herself included, but does not disclose it to her subordinates. Salem also claims to be responsible for Summer's fate.^{Vol. 7, Ch. 11 and Vol. 9, Ch. 4}

Her name is based on the town of Salem, Massachusetts, infamous for its witch trials, and alludes to the Wicked Witch from The Wonderful Wizard of Oz.

==== Cinder Fall ====
- Voiced by: Jessica Nigri^{Vol. 1 credits} / Yūko Kaida

Salem's right-hand woman whose Semblance, "Scorching Caress", allows her to heat objects and manipulate their shape. Her original weapon was Midnight, a pair of blades that combine into a bow, which she discarded after becoming the Fall Maiden, which enabled her to conjure weapons at will. Originally an orphan from Mistral, Cinder was adopted and brought to Atlas but was forced to become a slave at the Glass Unicorn hotel by her stepmother.

Cinder is an allusion to Cinderella.

==== Dr. Arthur Watts ====
- Voiced by: Christopher Sabat^{Vol. 4 credits} / Tōru Ōkawa

A disgraced Atlesian scientist, his main weapon is a twenty-bullet revolver while using his rings to both hack into networks and use hard-light Dust as a shield. ^{Vol. 7, Ch. 10–11} Watts served alongside Pietro, is an old acquaintance of Jacques and was the head of the Paladin project. Seeking revenge against Ironwood for preferring Pietro's P.E.N.N.Y. project, Watts faked his death during the Paladin incident and eventually joined Salem.^{Vol. 7, Ch. 2, 4, 7 & 9} He was left for dead in the fall of Atlas by Cinder.^{Vol. 8, Ch. 14}

Watts alludes to John Watson from Sherlock Holmes.

==== Tyrian Callows ====
- Voiced by: Jessie James Grelle / Yoku Shioya

A pale psychopathic scorpion Faunus with a long, black braided ponytail and yellow eyes that turn purple while striking with his stinger, showing himself to be extremely devoted to Salem and aware of her true goal. He wields The Queen's Servants, which are a pair of wrist-mounted blades with gun barrels. His Semblance allows him to channel his Aura at his hand and slice through another's Aura to cause severe damage.^{Vol. 7, Ch. 6}

Tyrian alludes to the scorpion from The Scorpion and the Frog while named after a shade of purple.

==== Hazel Reinart ====
- Voiced by: William Orendorff / Akio Ōtsuka

A muscular man who is normally reserved and composed with his Semblance, "Numbing Agent", serving as a form of painkiller whenever he embeds raw Dust crystals into his body to augment his strength.^{Vol. 5, Ch. 13} After failing to kill Salem, Hazel joined her as he blamed Ozpin for the death of his sister Gretchen during a training mission while she attended Beacon, his calm exterior replaced with rage when in Ozpin's presence.^{Vol. 5, Ch. 12} After learning of Salem's true goals, Hazel turns against her and sacrifices himself so her prisoners could escape.^{Vol. 8, Ch. 9}

Hazel and Gretchen's names come from Hansel and Gretel.

==== Mercury Black ====
- Voiced by: J.J. Castillo (Volume 2), Yuri Lowenthal (Volume 3–present) / Hikaru Midorikawa

A gray-haired associate of Cinder's who uses a pair of greaves, Talaria, that also function as guns. His legs are mechanical prosthetics which were implied to be surgically attached because of damage caused to his natural legs by his father, Marcus.^{Vol. 3, Ch. 7} Mercury is eventually promoted into Salem's inner circle.^{Vol. 8, Ch. 6}

He alludes to the Roman god of the same name.

==== Tock ====
- Voiced by: Ruth Urquhart

A crocodile Faunus from Maria's younger days as the Grimm Reaper, armed with a pair of saber swords, a set of sharp metal implanted teeth and possessing a Semblance that makes her nigh invulnerable for one minute at a time. Tock was sent by Salem to assassinate Maria because of her silver eyes, managing to blind Maria before being killed by her.^{Vol. 6, Ch. 7}

Tock is an allusion to the Crocodile from Peter Pan.

==== Vermillion Raddock ====
The main antagonist of RWBY: Grimm Campaign who was sent to Kuchinashi, a city in Mistral, in search of magical artifacts on behalf of Salem. Raddock possesses superhuman strength and fights with a 30-foot flail, his Semblance allows him to make his target's Semblance his own as well once their Aura comes into contact with his.

==== Grimm ====
The Creatures of Grimm are soulless monsters that appear throughout the natural world of Remnant as they are devoid of aura and thrive on the worst aspects of humanity. The Grimm are creations of the God of Darkness that manifest from his domain's Grimm Pits, pools containing a dark substance that kills a non-Grimm being on contact. The Grimm's purpose is to destroy everything made by the God of Light, which later includes humans whom both brothers created together.^{Vol. 4, Ch 8} Following the previous version of humanity wiped out by their creator, Grimm instinctively prey on new humans and Faunus races with the discovery of "Dust" and the establishment of the Huntsmen and Huntresses allowing them to control their numbers. But Salem, as the result of her attempted suicide in a Grimm Pit, is able to control the Grimm and has tried to fuse other humans with Grimm like herself, as she granted Cinder Fall a Grimm limb and created the Hound.^{Vol. 8, Ch. 1–2, 4 & 8} The Grimm are weak against the light of the Silver-eyed warriors (which is a gift of the God of Light), who can either petrify or vaporize them.

- Mike and Marty
  Voiced by: William Ball and Joe Nicolosi: Cinder's Beowolf lackies from "RWBY Chibi".
- Floyd
  Voiced by: Kerry Shawcross: Cinder's Geist henchman from "RWBY Chibi", who annoys Mike and Marty.

Each Grimm's appearance and name are based on animals and mythical creatures while the species' name as a whole comes from the brothers who wrote several fairy tales.

=== Cinder's faction ===
Roman Torchwick

- Voiced by: Gray G. Haddock (Volumes 1–3, Chibi)^{Vol. 1 credits}, Chris Wehkamp (Ice Queendom–present), Billy Kametz (Volume 9) / Shinichiro Miki

An orange-haired crime lord whom Ruby fights in the series' first episode, armed with the Melodic Cudgel, a cane which doubles as a firearm and grappling gun. Roman was born in Mistral and was left in an orphanage when he was young, causing him to have a low opinion about life and its ethics. Roman eventually became a thief in Mistral's lower parts where he was forced to join the Spiders, but eventually leaves for Vale and takes over its criminal underworld and later recruited by Cinder to aid them with their plans in Vale. Roman died in the fall of Beacon.^{Vol. 3, Ch. 11}

His attire is inspired by the lead character Alex from the novel/film A Clockwork Orange, while his name is primarily an allusion to Candlewick or Lampwick from Pinocchio.

Neopolitan

- Voiced by: Casey Lee Williams (BlazBlue: Cross Tag Battle) / Konomi Fujimura

Born Trivia Vanille and often nicknamed "Neo", is an associate of Roman with heterochromic eyes that change color between pink, brown, and white depending on her mood, while her hair is pink and brown with streaks of white. Neo has a parasol called Hush; containing a hidden blade in its handle, it is capable of blocking powerful blasts. Her illusion-based Semblance, "Overactive Imagination", has a variety of uses, from physical illusions to disguises for herself.^{Vol. 2, Ch. 4 & Vol. 3, Ch. 1} Trivia was the daughter of a rich family in Vale, but was kept in isolation for most of her childhood as her parents considered her useless because of her heterochromia as well as the fact that she was mute which they believed would make it impossible for her to marry someone of wealth. After meeting and befriending Roman Torchwick, she aids him in taking over city's criminal underworld and adopts the name Neopolitan after an imaginary friend she had which she later realized was a repressed version of her true self. After Roman's death, Neo blames Cinder and Ruby but teams up with the former because of their shared hatred against the latter, but is later betrayed by her. After seemingly getting her revenge against Ruby, Neo loses her sense of purpose,^{Vol. 9, Ch. 7} but after helping team RWBY and Jaune kill the Curious Cat, Neo begins to make peace with Roman's death and the heroes, consuming a leaf that will eventually heal her and make her better.^{Vol. 9, Ch. 10}

Neo's name and appearance both reference neapolitan ice cream. According to E.C. Myers, Neo's birth name is a reference to the ancient Greek deity Hecate. Neo is portrayed as mute, and communicates with signs, à la Wile E. Coyote in the comedy spinoff series RWBY Chibi.

=== Dr. Merlot ===
- Voiced by: Dave Fennoy

A scientist and former colleague of Ozpin before they drifted apart due to Merlot's obsession of understanding the Grimm and improve on their design. Merlot established Merlot Industries in the Mountain Glenn settlement, being the cause of its failure when he had his subordinates attract Grimm for use in their experiments. But Merlot survived and in RWBY: Grimm Eclipse, which takes place between Volumes 2 and 3 of the series, continued his research on an island where he created mutant variants until Team RWBY's interference forces him to self-destruct his laboratory, his fate currently a mystery. Dr. Merlot is an allusion to Dr. Moreau.

=== Lady Beatrix Browning ===
The Headmisterss of Lady Browning's Preparatory Academy For Girls, who secretly is an agent for Spider in Vale, with her school being a cover for training assassins. She was exposed by Roman Torchwick and Neopolitan.

=== White Fang ===
The White Fang is an organization composed of persecuted Faunus fighting for civil rights like those committed by the Schnee Dust Company using their people for labor, originally established by Ghira Belladonna as a peaceful civil disobedience group. But when he stepped down five years prior to the beginning of the series and is succeeded by Sienna Khan, the White Fang became a terrorist cell under the gradual influence of Adam Taurus who staged a coup and killed Sienna before the organization became fragmented in the aftermath of the Battle of Haven, when he killed many of the remaining members as well.

- Adam Taurus
  Voiced by: Garrett Hunter/ Yūichi Nakamura: A red-haired, half-blind, and scarred man with bull horns and Blake's former boyfriend and mentor turned archenemy in the "Black" trailer. When he was introduced in the series, he was revealed in Volume 3 as the leader of a White Fang splinter group based in Vale, and was coerced into working for Cinder to destroy Beacon and later Haven. He is the one who brutally sliced off Yang's arm during the Fall of Beacon. After his attempt to blow up Haven failed, he murdered the remaining White Fang members when they turn on him for his ruthlessness. Alone, Adam began stalking Blake, and after a prolonged fight with her and Yang, was stabbed by them and then fell to his death.^{Vol. 6, Ch. 12} Adam is based on The Beast from Beauty and the Beast, with elements of Gaston from the 1991 film.
- White Fang Lieutenant
  Voiced by: Gray G. Haddock^{Vol. 2 credits} / Kenji Nomura: A higher-ranking White Fang member under Adam who works with Roman Torchwick during Volume 2, armed with a chainsaw-like sword which he uses during his battle against Weiss on the train towards Vale. After winning the fight, Blake intervenes to rescue her and escape. What happened to him after the train crash is unknown, as he is not seen nor heard from again.^{Vol. 2, Ch. 11}
- Sienna Khan
  Voiced by: Monica Rial: The former High Leader of the White Fang who has tiger ears, succeeding Ghira after he stepped down.^{Vol. 5, Ch. 3} Her weapon is Cerberus Whip, a chain whip with three detachable Dust blades, Her Semblance, "Grudge", makes her stronger, faster and more vicious when her foes' Auras are weakened and broken.
- Corsac and Fennec Albain
  Voiced by: Derek Mears and Mike McFarland: Fox Faunus brothers who represent the White Fang in Menagerie.^{Vol. 4, Ch. 5} Corsac is taller with a gray fox tail, and Fennec is shorter with light brown fox ears. During their mutiny against Blake's parents, Fennec dies and Corsac is arrested.^{Vol. 5, Ch. 8–10}

=== The Crown ===
The Crown is an organization based in Vacuo. They serve as the major antagonists in the RWBY novels After the Fall and Before the Dawn.

- Jax and Gillian Asturias
  Twin siblings who are the founding leaders of the Crown, seeking to destroy Vacuo's government and restore it to a monarchy under their rule. Jax possesses a mind control Semblance while Gillian's Semblance enables her to augment others with Aura she siphoned from people, the latter's Semblance being the cause of their mother's death at childbirth with Jax being born frail and dependent on his sister. Raised by their father to be xenophobic towards foreigners and believing they were descended from Vacuo's first king Malik the Sunderer, the twins dropped out from Shade Academy along with their teammates Rosa Schwein and Argento Pocoron to establish Crown and form an army of brainwashed super soldiers. They are captured after Gillian surrenders in order to save Jax.
- Carmine Esclados
  A veteran Huntress who is the main antagonist of RWBY: After the Fall, armed with sai and possessing a telekinesis Semblance she uses to manipulate her weapons and local weather patterns. She was originally from Atlas before she transferred to Vacuo and graduated Shade Academy, hired alongside her partner Bertilak Celadon by the Asturias twins to traffick people with highly potent Semblances before they are captured by Team CFVY.

=== Other Antagonists ===
- Hei Xiong
  The leader of the Xiong family, the dominant crime syndicate in Vale and the father of Junior, who died in a gang war between his organization and Spider started by Roman Torchwick and Neopolitan.
- Hei "Junior" Xiong
  Voiced by: Jack Shannon Pattillo / Katsuya Miyamoto: A club manager who fights Yang in the "Yellow" trailer. His weapon is a bazooka that can change into a large bat-like club. He has some sort of connection to Torchwick, who initially recruited Junior's minions for his early dust robberies before replacing the henchmen with White Fang members.^{Yellow Trailer, Vol. 1, Ch. 1, & Vol. 2, Ch. 4} His name means "black bear" in Chinese, with his nickname alluding to the baby bear from Goldilocks.
- Melanie and Miltiades "Miltia" Malachite
  Voiced by: Maggie Tominey / Aya Suzaki: A pair of black-haired twins who work for Junior. They are the daughters of gangster leader, Lil' Miss Malachite. Melanie fights with bladed heels while Miltia utilizes a pair of claws.^{Yellow Trailer} They are altered designs of the first design of Ruby and Weiss, and they allude to the story of Snow White and Rose Red.
- Jimmy and Carmel Vanille
  Neo's parents, her father was the City Manager of Vale and secretly a mole for the Xiong family, while her mother was a graduate of Lady Browning's school and served as a spy on the Xiong family for Spider. They both were killed in the gang war between the Xiong family and Spider.
- Lil' Miss Malachite
  Voiced by: Luci Christian: The leader of a Mistral gang known as Spider, whose members have a spider tattoo, possessing a sixth sense that allows her to predict the current whereabouts of others. When approached by Cinder for the location of Ruby and her friends in Volume 6, Malachite withheld the information out of curiosity over who would ask for Cinder.^{Vol. 6, Ch. 2} Her hunch is later proven true when hired by Neo.^{Vol. 6, Ch. 5} She is also the mother of the twins Melanie and Miltia.^{Vol. 6 Commentary} She is an allusion of Little Miss Muffet.
- Jacques Schnee
  Voiced by: Jason Douglas / Madoka Shiga: The husband of Willow, the father of Weiss, Winter, and Whitley, the son-in-law of Nicholas, and the former head to the Schnee Dust Company. His surname was "Gelée" before he married into the Schnee family, priding himself in maintaining the family's good name at any cost. While Jacques brought great success to the SDC after convinced his father-in-law Nicholas to let him take over the company, some of the practices he established to maintain the SDC have been considered controversial.^{WoR} The actions of the White Fang stating attacks on SDC over poor labor practices involving Faunus employees gradually plays a part in Jacques's strained relation with Weiss,^{Vol. 1, Ch. 15} with their family irreparably broken when Jacques admits to Willow that he married her only for the Schnee name during Weiss' tenth birthday.^{Vol. 5, Ch. 8} Jacques allied himself with Watts against Ironwood, but his betrayal is exposed which leads to his arrest and death.^{Vol. 7, Ch. 4, 6, 9 & Vol. 8, Ch. 13} The Dream version of Jacques, which takes on the form of "Big Nicholas," (a play-on name for the Big Brother) serves as the secondary antagonist of Ice Queendom. Jacques alludes to Jack Frost.

== Fairy tales ==
=== Maidens ===
Maidens are women who are capable of wielding great magic, including control over the weather and natural elements, as well as being the only ones to access one of the four Relics each. ^{Vol. 5, Ch. 1} The original Four Maidens, each named after the four seasons, were given their powers by Ozpin in one of his past lives. With each maiden's death, their magic is transferred to another woman whom they thought of, otherwise it will be random. ^{Vol. 5, Ch. 7}

Amber

- Voiced by: Laura Bailey / Ayako Kawasumi

The previous Fall Maiden who is a skilled combatant armed with a staff with Dust crystals on each end and is capable of hand-to-hand combat. After Cinder's attack and siphoning her power mortally weakened her, her body was placed on a life support in Beacon's Vault, Ozpin resolved to transfer Amber's remaining powers and soul Pyrrha. ^{Vol. 3, Ch. 6–7} But Amber is killed by Cinder as the process commenced. ^{Vol. 3, Ch. 11}

Fria

- Voiced by: Luci Christian

The previous Winter Maiden who was placed on life support at an Atlesian medical facility due to her old age. Fria was visited only by Winter who meant to be her successor. Before her passing, Fira gave her powers to Penny instead of Winter. ^{Vol. 7, Ch. 13} Fria alludes to the character Blue Fairy from the tale Pinocchio.

=== Deities and Relic Beings ===
The creators of Remnant were two deity brothers, who were the firstborns of the Tree in Ever After. When the Jabberwalker began its killings spree, the brothers quarreled with each other over the balance of life they disrupted. But the Tree sent them away because their creations were too much in Ever After.^{Vol. 9, Ch. 10} In Remnant, the brothers created humanity together on the foundation of creation, destruction, knowledge and choice. When Salem tried to have them resurrect Ozma, the brothers curse her with immortality as punishment. When she led a human rebellion against the brothers, the God of Darkness destroys all of humanity except for Salem, and the brothers left Remnant while leaving behind the four Relics as a beacon to summon them to judge the new race of humans that came to be in their absence.^{Vol. 6, Ch. 3}

Deities

- God of Light
  Voiced by: Chase McCaskill: The eldest deity brother, the first to refuse Salem's request to resurrect Ozma as it would disrupt natural order and cursed her with immortality after she used his brother to commit the deed. Following his brother wiping out the humans, the God of Light grants Ozma the ability to reincarnate to guide the new race of humans while also warning him to be wary of Salem and creating the four Relics as a means to summon him and his brother back to Remnant.^{Vol. 6, Ch. 3} After seeing Jinn's vision, Maria deduces that the power of the silver-eyed warriors comes from the God of Light.^{Vol. 6, Ch. 8}
- God of Darkness
  Voiced by: Bruce DuBose: The younger of the deity brothers who both created the Grimm and granted magic to humans. When he resurrects Ozma at Salem's behest before learning he was her second choice following a brief fight with the God of Light, the God of Darkness joins his brother in cursing Salem and later wipes out humanity when Salem turned them on the brothers. The God of Darkness shatters the moon when leaving Remnant with his brother.^{Vol. 6, Ch. 3}

Relic Beings

- Jinn
  Voiced by: Colleen Clinkenbeard: The being within the Relic of Knowledge, summoned by whoever says her name while holding it, freezing time for her and her summoner during that duration. Jinn can answer three questions once a century, only able to answer events that had or are occurring as a manifestation of knowledge.^{Vol. 6, Ch. 1–2}
- Ambrosius
  Voiced by: Valentine Stokes: The being within the Relic of Creation that has an energetic and playful personality. Like Jinn, he stops time for him and whoever summons him. Ambrosius has the power to create anything his summoner wishes, though his power has certain limits. He can make only one creation at a time, and when he creates something else, his previous creation ceases to exist. He also needs blueprints to know what exactly he is going to create, and cannot bring the dead back to life and use his powers to destroy.^{Vol. 8, Ch. 12} He is conjecturally believed to allude to Merlin.

=== Ever After ===
The Ever After is an alternate world where Team RWBY, Jaune, and Neo have fallen into during the events of Volume 9. It is heavily inspired by Alice in Wonderland. In-universe, it serves as the setting for the fairy tale, The Girl Who Fell Through the World.

- Alyx
  Voiced by: Shara Kirby: A girl from Vacuo and the main character of The Girl Who Fell Through the World. Her weapon of choice was a dagger. According to Ozpin, she was said to run away from her problems, and instead of learning her lesson, she only spread her failure. She and her brother Lewis ended up in the Ever After with her tendencies becoming worse than the descriptions of the Tale. Alyx promised the Curious Cat to take them to remnant, but after reflecting in the Tree decided to stay behind and make up for the harm she did in there, but was killed by Curious Cat for breaking her promise. Alyx alludes to Alice, while her brother is named after Lewis Carroll.
- Little
  Voiced by: Luci Christian: A mouse Ruby encounters when she first enters the Ever After. They then join Team RWBY as their guide, though they are not always helpful as they tend to sleep. Little is crushed by Neo while trying to save Ruby, but ascends into a bigger mouse that Ruby names Somewhat. Alludes to the Dormouse and Stuart Little.
- The Herbalist
  Voiced by: Christopher Guerrero: A caterpillar-like individual who lives in the mushroom-like acre of the Ever After. Using incense, he has Team RWBY confront past versions of themselves.^{Vol. 9, Ch. 4} The Herbalist is later reborn as a butterfly after his ascension.^{Vol. 9, Ch. 9} Alludes to the Caterpillar.
- Blacksmith
  Voiced by: Kimlinh Tran: The avatar of the Tree who appears as a blacksmith. When Afterans ascend, she turns them into whoever or whatever they choose to be.^{Vol. 9, Ch. 10}
- The Jabberwalker
  Voiced by: Richard Norman: A masked purple creature that wanders the Ever After. It speaks in single words at a time. The Jabberwalker can prevent the denizens of Ever After from reincarnating by eating them, as it was intended by the Deity Brothers to be the destroyer of the Cat's creations.^{Vol. 9, Ch. 5 & 10} It alludes to the Jabberwocky.
- The Red Prince
  Voiced by: Michael Malconian: Ruler of the Crimson Castle. In the past, the Prince was the King who played his games fairly. But after losing to Alyx, he "ascended" into a prince who cheats to win.^{Vol. 9, Ch. 5} He alludes to the Queen of Hearts.
- Curious Cat
  Voiced by: Robbie Daymond: A purple and blue mosaic-patterned cat that can split their body parts. They can calm someone by giving them a part of their own heart. The Cat was the first creation of the Deity Brothers. They later helped Alyx and Lewis reach the Tree in return for going with them. But when the former breaks her promise, the Cat kills her, leading to their insanity with no one to mend their broken heart.^{Vol. 9, Ch. 9-10} The Cat initially serve as Team RWBY's guide throughout Ever After, but they leave after Jaune reveals that they offer sacrifices to the Tree.^{Vol. 9, Ch. 4-6} When Ruby is overwhelmed by Neo, the Cat reveals their true intentions to her: to mentally wear Ruby down, take over her body, make their way to Remnant and find out why their creators abandoned them in the Ever After. The Cat is eliminated by team RWBY, Jaune and Neo.^{Vol. 9, Ch. 10} Alludes to the Cheshire Cat.

== DC ==
In March 2021, DC Comics published a crossover comic series, RWBY x Justice League, featuring several iconic superheroes from the Justice League. However, these characters are Remnant parallels from their DC counterparts. In Justice League x RWBY: Super Heroes and Huntsmen, the Justice League are the originals who, in Part One, were transported to a digital simulation of Remnant and placed inside the bodies of teenagers, with some of them turning into Faunus. In DC/RWBY, Remnant begins to merge with the DC universe, granting its inhabitants Semblances.

=== Justice League ===
- Clark Kent / Superman
  Voiced by: Chandler Riggs and Travis Willingham: In the comics, Clark is a farm boy from Patch who helps Taiyang with farming. His Semblance, "Yellow Sun Empowerment", gives him super strength, speed, heat vision and flight. According to Clark, his Semblance draws power from the sun and he cannot use it during nighttime. In the movies, Clark uses a hand-held hammer in battle.
- Diana Prince / Wonder Woman
  Voiced by: Natalie Alyn Lind and Laura Bailey: In the comics, Diana is an automaton created by her Faunus mothers. Her Semblance, "Weapon Summoning", calls forth her lasso, tiara and gauntlets. In DC/RWBY, her semblance, Divine Healing allows her to heal mortal wounds.
- Bruce Wayne / Batman
  Voiced by: Nat Wolff and Troy Baker: In the comics, Bruce is a wealthy bat Faunus hailing from Atlas. His weapon, Batwing, is a double headed battle axe. His Semblance, "Detective Mode", gives him the ability to detect patterns and unlock puzzles. In the movies, Bruce has bat wings instead of ears. In DC/RWBY, his Semblance is Precognition which allows him to see his opponent's move in combat before they make them.
- Barry Allen / The Flash
  Voiced by: David Errigo Jr and David Dastmalchian: In the comics, Barry is a tortoise Faunus with green scales on his shoulders. His Semblance, "Constant Speed" makes him super fast and leaves a trail of lightning. In the movies, Barry is a human fighting with a spear. He was possessed by Kilg%re in Part One.
- Jesse Quick
  A fox Faunus. In the comics she serves as a bait in Barry's place.
- Victor Stone / Cyborg
  Voiced by: Tru Valentino: A cyborg. In the comics, he was an astronaut that was involved in a space program accident which he miraculously survived. Victor holds a grudge against the SDC and steals their technology for his prosthetic parts.
- Arthur Curry
  A shark Faunus with fins on his elbows and back. His Semblance enables him to communicate with animals through telepathy. In the past, Arthur saved Clark's life in a Dust mine.
- Jessica Cruz / Green Lantern
  Voiced by: Jeannie Tirado: A member of the Green Lantern Corps. In the comics, Jessica arrived on Remnant in search of Starro, acquiring a Semblance while still able to use her Lantern Ring. She saved Victor from the space program accident. In Part One, Jessica becomes a teenager.
- Mari McCabe / Vixen
  Voiced by Ozioma Akagha: Mari appears in the movies and is a fox-tailed Faunus who utilizes a machete with her Tantu Totem to summon animal spirits.
- Barbra Gordon / Batgirl
  one of Batman's sidekick from the DC Universe whose Semblance allows her to see the history of anything she touches.
- Dick Grayson / Nightwing
  one of Batman's sidekick from the DC Universe who can inspire others with his Semblance.
- Dinah Lance / Black Canary
  Voice by Jamie Chung: a member of the Justice League who along with team RWBY stopped Kilg%re and Watts from unleashing Grimm into the universe.

=== Allies ===
- Alfred Pennyworth
  Batman's butler who can create anything at will with his semblance.
- Zatanna and Constantine
  A couple with actual magical powers, with the former gaining a semblance similar to Weiss.
- Lois Lane
  Superman's lover whose Semblance allows her to see through lies.

=== Supervillains ===
- Starro
  An alien creature that arrived on Remnant two decades prior to the events of RWBY x Justice League crossover comic series, and has gradually been taking over with an interest in powerful Semblances.
- Kilg%re
  Voiced by: Tru Valentino: An AI from the DC Universe who, in Justice League x RWBY: Super Heroes and Huntsmen, trapped the Justice League as well as teams RWBY and JNR in a Simulation of Remnant with the collaboration of Arthur Watts from Remnant and later helped him escape to the Earth in order to conquer it.
- Lex Luthor
  Superman's archenemy who somehow arrived to Remnant in DC/RWBY, and made a deal with Salem to open a way for the Grimm into his world, with his goal being the people of his world gaining Semblances and rendering the superheroes obsolete, with his being opening portals and the villains who had negative emotions for too long controlling the Grimm. The process went out of control and Remnant began to absorb the DC Universe.
- Barbara Ann Minerva / Cheetah
  A human-cheetah hybrid who seeks the destruction of anything legendary.
- The Joker
  Batman's archenemy who fuses with a Nuckelavee and becomes the source of the Remnant consumption of the DC Universe.
- Mark Mardon / Weather Wizard
  Voiced by Travis Willingham: one of Flash's Rogue's gallery who helped the Justice League and team RWBY stop Kilg%re and Watts from unleashing Grimm into the universe.
- Sam Scrudder / Mirror Master
  Voiced by Troy Baker: one of Flash's Rogue's gallery who helped the Justice League and team RWBY stop Kilg%re and Watts from unleashing Grimm into the universe.
- Waylon Jones / Killer Croc
  Voiced by Maxwell Friedman: one of Batman's Rogue's gallery who helped the Justice League and team RWBY stop Kilg%re and Watts from unleashing Grimm into the universe.

== Works cited notes ==
- "Vol." is the shortened form for "Volume" and refers to the DVD volume or season for the series. "Ch." is shortened for "Chapter" and refers to the episode number within the volume, with Vol. 1 having 16 and Vol. 2–4 having 12 chapters. "WoR" refers to "World of Remnant", an encyclopedic series of short videos that reveals more information about the world of RWBY. "WoR" has been incorporated in the RWBY volumes since Volume 2. See List of RWBY episodes for more details.
