= Leah Kauffman =

American singer-songwriter (born 1986)

- Born: 1986 (age 38–39); Abington Township, Pennsylvania, United States
- Genres: Pop, R&B
- Occupation(s): Singer, songwriter, actress

Leah Kauffman (born c. 1986) is an American singer and songwriter who is responsible for singing and writing popular viral videos, including "My Box in a Box", "I Got a Crush... on Obama", "Obama Girl vs. Giuliani Girl", "I Like a Boy", and "Bernie Bae". The first song was written by Kauffman, the second and third were co-written by Kauffman and Ben Relles. Kauffman does not appear in the videos, instead actresses lip sync to her vocals. Most recently, Kauffman wrote and performed the song "Perfected: The Ann Coulter Song", the video of which features Kauffman, rather than a lip-syncing stand-in, for the first time.

Kauffman was born in Abington Township, Pennsylvania, and is a 2004 graduate of Abington Senior High School. She majored in magazine journalism at Temple University. In 2014, she was the Executive Producer of Philly.com's Lifestyle & Entertainment verticals.
