= Crush on Obama =

- Amber Lee Ettinger in the viral music video

Song by Leah Kauffman
- Published: YouTube
- Released: June 13, 2007
- Genre: Political, comedy, pop
- Length: 3:18
- Songwriters: Leah Kauffman, Ben Relles
- Producer: Rick Friedrich

"Crush on Obama" is an Internet viral video, first posted on YouTube in June 2007 featuring a young woman seductively singing of her love for then-U.S. Senator (later President) Barack Obama.

== Background ==
The video was produced by BarelyPolitical.com, was lip-synched for the video by actress and model Amber Lee Ettinger, and Leah Kauffman (of "My Box in a Box" fame) provided the vocals.

The concept was the brainchild of 32-year-old advertising executive Ben Relles. "Crush on Obama" was co-written and produced by Rick Friedrich. The creators sold two shirts and the red shorts used in the video in an eBay auction. One of the shirts garnered $1,000. Proceeds from the auction were donated to the Philadelphia Committee to End Homelessness. On May 25, 2007, Ben Relles placed an ad on the online classified website, Craigslist, seeking a music video director. The ad was answered by filmmakers Kevin Arbouet and Larry Strong. Filming began later that same day in and around various New York City landmarks. Arbouet and Strong co-directed and shot the entire video in about six hours. The whole film project took approximately two to three weeks.

On June 13, 2007, the video was posted to the video sharing website YouTube and garnered over one thousand views within the first five hours of its posting. By the second day the American news media had taken notice of the video's growing popularity. Relles, Ettinger and Kauffman appeared on many television news programs. The video was nominated in the Politics category in the 2007 YouTube Awards.

== Obama's response ==
When asked about the video by the Des Moines Register on June 18, 2007, Obama said, "It's just one more example of the fertile imagination of the Internet. More stuff like this will be popping up all the time." Obama told the Associated Press that the Obama Girl video had upset his daughters and said, "You do wish people would think about what impact their actions have on kids and families."

Obama's campaign stated they had nothing to do with the video's creation. Kauffman and Ettinger confirmed this during their June 15, 2007 appearance on Fox & Friends, where they said that the video was not made to support Barack Obama in his campaign but rather for fun. They also expressed interest in making more videos of the same genre for other candidates of other parties as well.
