= Amber Lee Ettinger =

American model (born 1982)

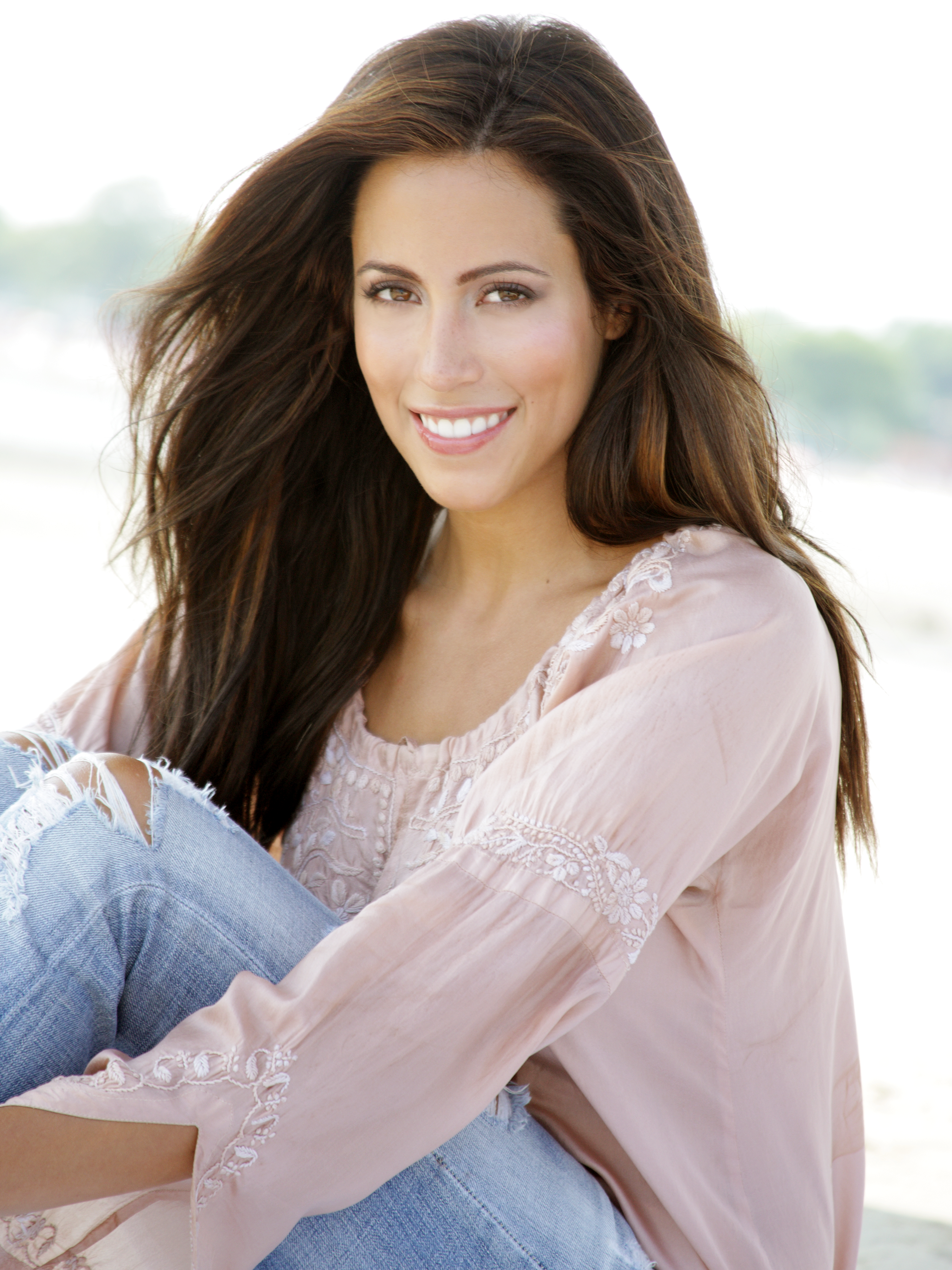
- Ettinger in 2011
- Born: October 2, 1982 (age 44); Hazleton, Pennsylvania, U.S.
- Occupations: Actress; model; singer; internet celebrity
- Years active: 2003–present

YouTube information
- Channel: amberleeonline
- Years active: 2006–present
- Genre: Comedy
- Subscribers: 3.41 thousand
- Views: 233,482
- Last updated: September 11, 2025

Amber Lee Ettinger (born October 2, 1982) is an American actress, Internet celebrity, model, and singer.

Ettinger became a celebrity after being hired to portray Obama Girl in Barely Political's June 2007 Internet video "Crush on Obama", in which she lip-synced the lyrics to the song expressing admiration of then-U.S. Senator Barack Obama. The video led to numerous sketch comedy appearances and interviews, including Saturday Night Live, Geraldo at Large, The O'Reilly Factor, and Hannity.

== Early career ==
Ettinger is a native of Hazleton, Pennsylvania. Her interest in entertainment began at an early age. She participated in beauty pageants, dance recitals, theater, and cheerleading competitions.

Ettinger moved to New York City to attend the Fashion Institute of Technology to study fashion and clothing design, having expressed hopes to create her own clothing line and other business ventures. She is currently a designer alongside her mother Roseann Ettinger, together they have created the "Inspired by Amber" jewelry line.

Ettinger was crowned Miss NYC and Miss Alpine New Jersey in the 2003–2004 Miss Hawaiian Tropic pageant, later augmenting that title with a nod as Howard Stern's Miss Howard TV in June 2007. Ettinger was Hooters Miss Manhattan, representing them in the 2003 International Swimsuit Pageant.

Ettinger appeared in commercials for VH1's Pepsi Smash, Bikini Zone, and Certain Dri. She has also appeared in a video for The Onion. She was featured in music videos for Thalía, The John Popper Project, and Styles P.

Ettinger has traveled around the world modeling for swimsuit, lingerie and fashion companies such as Ujena, Born, Baby Phat, Ralph Lauren, and Tommy Hilfiger. Ettinger has been featured in many publications such as Maxim, FHM, and Elle. She has appeared on the cover of Wired and Steppin Out magazine.

== Viral videos, and response ==
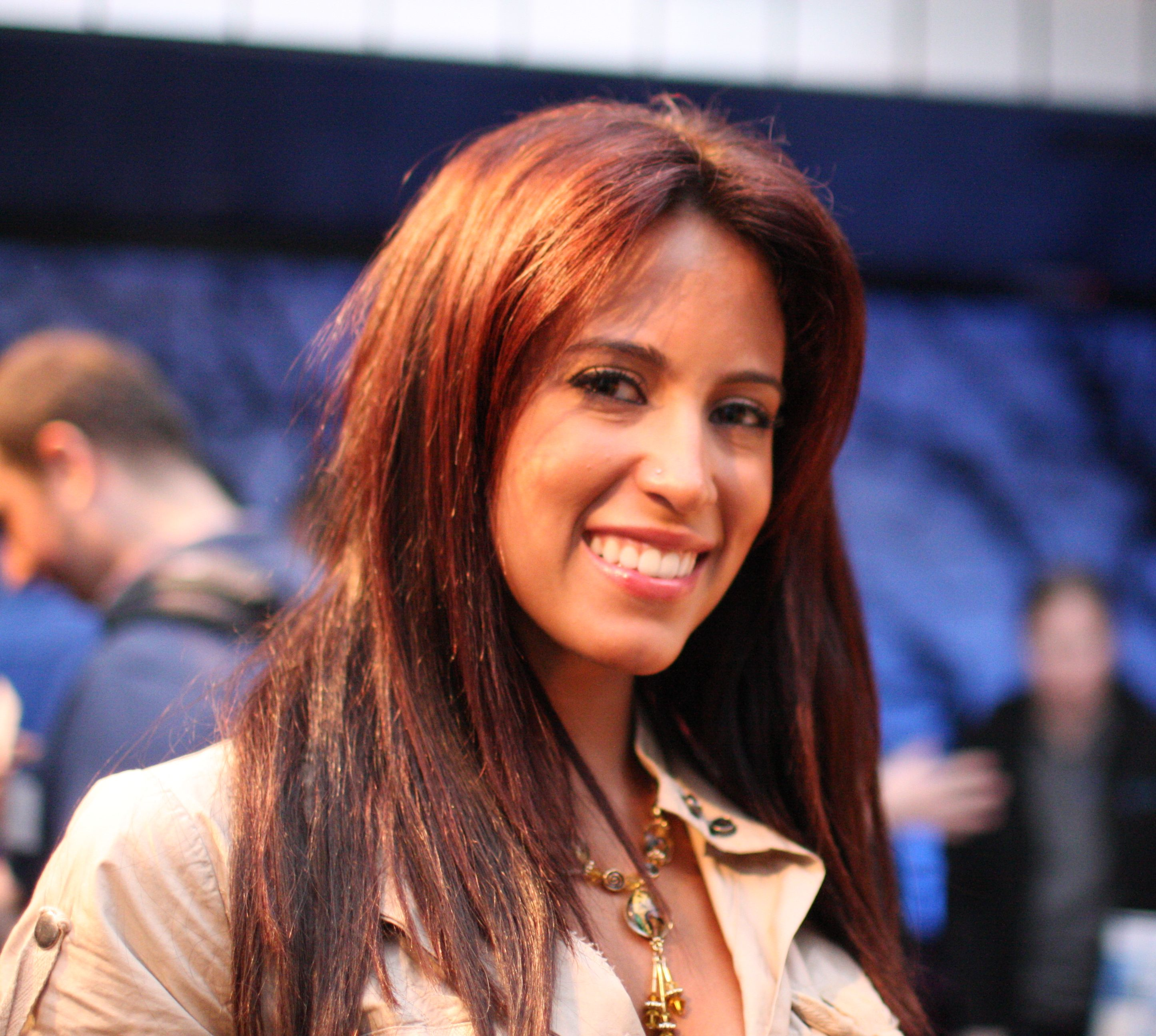
Ettinger in 2008

Ettinger was hired by Barely Political founder Ben Relles to appear in the "Crush on Obama" viral video, which was posted to the Barely Political channel on YouTube in June 2007. She appeared in a later video called "Hillary! Stop the attacks! Love, Obama Girl", released on March 25, 2008. On May 7, 2008, Barely Political posted a YouTube video with Ettinger and former Democratic and Libertarian Party presidential candidate Mike Gravel, entitled "Mike Gravel Lobbies for the Obama Girl Vote". In the video, Gravel tries to persuade her to switch her support from Obama to him. She and Relles guest-lectured in Paul Levinson's class at Fordham University on September 21, 2007.

In late September 2008, Ettinger made a YouTube video with Independent candidate Ralph Nader in which he argued that he should be included in the debates. The video was a spoof of conventional sitcoms and was called "The Obama Girl and Ralph Nader Show". Also featuring former Governor of Minnesota Jesse Ventura, the video followed what would happen if Obama Girl and Ralph Nader shared an office.

In the fall of 2008, Ettinger starred in a parody of "I Got a Crush on Obama" with a promotional video for EA's Red Alert 3. In it, she professes her allegiance to Howard Ackerman, a fictional presidential candidate played by actor J. K. Simmons. Since then she has been featured in multiple videos by Barely Political, including parodies of Jennifer Lopez, Fergie and Catwoman.

In February of the election year 2012, Ettinger collaborated with Obama impressionist Iman Crosson (Alphacat) in the PoliPop video "Glease" which was a spoof of the song "You're the One That I Want" from the film Grease and television series Glee, in which "a smitten Obama seeks the affection (read: vote) of the Obama Girl". A related music single was also released. In April 2012, "Glease" was included as part of the in-flight entertainment line-up for Virgin America airline.

As the 2012 election approached, news organizations mentioned and interviewed Ettinger as a barometer of whether Obama would be re-elected. More than a year before the 2012 election, CNN Newsroom's Brooke Baldwin had remarked, jokingly, that "obviously, the Obama girl is the litmus test for who will win in 2012." In 2012, Ettinger declined to state who she was supporting for President. Sean Hannity interviewed Ettinger on Fox News Channel's Hannity about her level of support for Obama; Ettinger explained that her 2007 Crush on Obama video "encompassed what a lot of Americans were feeling the excitement for hope and change" and that now (June 2012) she hadn't given up on Obama, but added that her options (for voting in November 2012) were open. In a Fox News Channel opinion piece, J.D. Gordon used Ettinger's indecision in 2012 as a specific example of Obama's waning support.

== Music ==
Ettinger was a singer with Obama impersonator Iman Crosson in the music single "Glease" (February 14, 2012; PoliPop, and Maker Studios).

Ettinger released her own music EP titled Queen of the Web (October 29, 2008; Silver Curve Records), the EP including three tracks:

1. "Second Time"
2. "Second Time Remix"
3. "Surrender"

In an August 2008 interview, Wired magazine asked Ettinger about "her double life as an online sensation and actual person", with Ettinger describing her background in fashion design, modeling and acting. Ettinger said that she was not singing about Obama in the EP's songs, and staking out her own musical identity after lip-synching the 2007 "I've Got a Crush" video, Ettinger explained that "Obama Girl's going to sing about Obama, but Amber Lee Ettinger's going to sing about other things that are going on in her life."

== Other projects ==
On March 10, 2010, she appeared on Shear Genius as one of the models to be styled for headshots. In mid-2010, Ettinger became a correspondent on fashion for the network WPIX in NYC.

On December 17, 2012, she appeared on the game show Take It All hosted by Howie Mandel making it to the final round. She chose "Keep Mine" while her opponent chose "Take It All" and took everything winning in excess of $500k.

In 2013, Ettinger appeared in a commercial for Natural Light as a lifeguard. A banned version of the same commercial also appeared online.

== Personal life ==
Ettinger has said that she did not vote in the primary for the 2008 presidential election but that she did vote in the 2008 general election.

She is of German, Italian, Swedish and Irish ancestry. She has an older brother and two younger sisters.
