= Andrea Feczko =

American television presenter

- Born: Andrea Marie Feczko; October 17, 1985 (age 40); Troy, Michigan, U.S.
- Education: New York University
- Occupations: Television presenter, producer, writer
- Years active: 2007–present

Andrea Marie Feczko (born October 17, 1985) is an American television presenter, producer, and writer. She has hosted shows for media outlets including AOL, CBS, Fuse, FX, HLN, MTV, Syfy, and Yahoo!.

Feczko is best known for her appearances on web television, including starring in a series of YouTube parody music videos for Barely Productions (among them "Glitter Puke", a parody of Kesha's "Tik Tok" that garnered over 150 million views and became YouTube's second most watched video of 2010), and co-hosting "Ultra Live", the live stream of the Ultra Music Festival, with over 20 million viewers worldwide, leading her to be named "one of the most recognized reporters on the EDM scene".

== Early life ==
Feczko was born in Troy, Michigan. As a child, she was a competitive figure skater. After graduating high school, she moved to New York City, where she studied journalism and communications at New York University, graduating magna cum laude in 2007. While attending New York University, Feczko studied overseas in Florence in Italy and London in the United Kingdom, as well as interning with CTV News in Vancouver, Canada.

== Television hosting career ==
After graduating from university, Feczko worked as a waitress while trying to break into the entertainment industry. She began her career with Next News Networks in New York, hosting the web television newscast Fast Lane Daily.

Feczko subsequently relocated to Los Angeles, where she took hosting classes and voice lessons. She went on to host shows including Yahoo!'s Daytime in No Time, Syfy's Blastr TV, and Samsung's SOS Island.

In 2010, Feczko came to global prominence after starring in "Glitter Puke", a parody of the Kesha music video "Tik Tok" on the Barely Productions YouTube channel "Key of Awesome". "Glitter Puke" was YouTube's second most watched video of 2010 and ultimately received over 150 million views, making it the most viewed YouTube parody video of all time. In the same year, she joined the mixed martial arts promotion King of the Cage as a backstage reporter for its live broadcast on HDNet.

In 2012, Feczko became an MTV VJ, hosting MTV Essentials.

In 2015, Feckzo produced the documentary Japan's War on Dance: Clubbing in the State of Fueiho for VICE. That same year, she co-hosted Vacation Chasers, a four episode show airing on HLN. In 2016, she hosted the travel documentary 100 Best Places for TV Land, the web series Get Me in There for Heineken and Major League Soccer, and the reality television show Vacation Creation for the Carnival Corporation.

== Personal life ==
Feczko is of Ukrainian descent.

== Filmography ==
=== Film ===
Year	Title	Role	Notes
2016	2nd Annual Babes in Toyland Pet Edition	Herself	

=== Television ===
Year	Title	Role	Notes
2009	E-Asylum	Herself	Recurring role
2011	California Adventure TV	Herself	
2013	SOS Island	Herself	Recurring role (2 episodes)
2014–2015	Nub TV	Herself	Recurring role (8 episodes)
2015	Vacation Chasers	Herself	Recurring role (4 episodes)
2016	100 Best Places	Herself	Recurring role
2016–present	Vacation Creation	Herself	Recurring role

=== Web series ===
Year	Title	Role	Notes
2016	Get Me in There	Herself	Recurring role (10 episodes)

== Bibliography ==
- Chicken Soup for the Soul: Teens Talk Middle School: 101 Stories of Life, Love, and Learning for Younger Teens (2007)
