= The Key of Awesome =

Comedy YouTube channel (2007–2018)

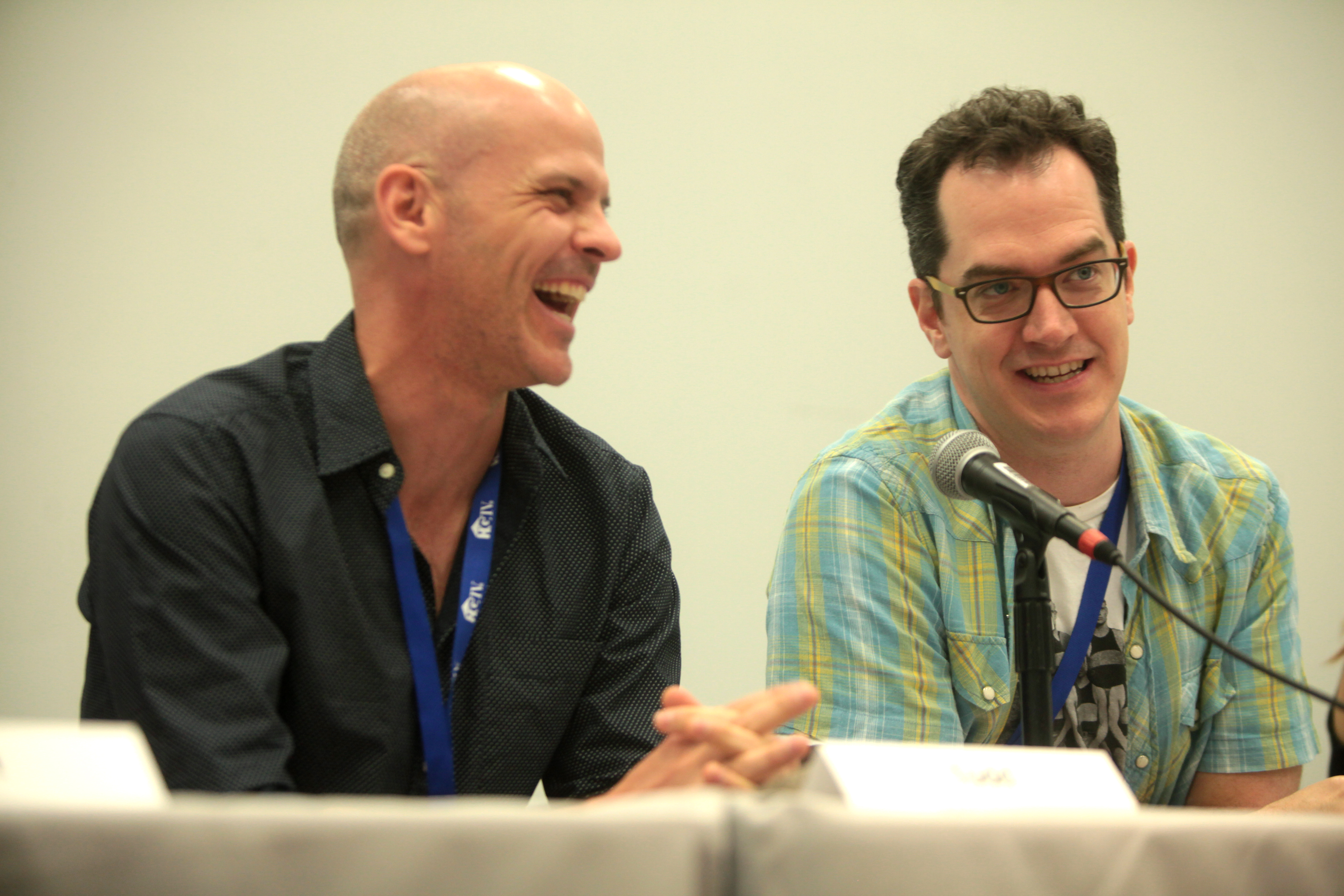
- Todd Womack (left) and Mark Douglas (right), principal writers and stars of Barely Productions, at VidCon 2014 in the Anaheim Convention Center

YouTube information
- Channel: The Key of Awesome
- Years active: 2007–2018 (on indefinite hiatus)
- Genres: Entertainment; Comedy; Parody
- Subscribers: 5.37 million
- Views: 3.41 billion
- Last updated: November 18, 2026

The Key of Awesome (formerly Barely Productions and Barely Political) is a YouTube channel that produced comedy videos starring writer/performer Mark Douglas. "The Key of Awesome" was created by Mark Douglas and Ben Relles and is the channel's most popular series, mainly producing viral music videos and parodies. Barely Political was created in June 2007 by Ben Relles and subsequently debuted its first music video, "Crush on Obama", starring Amber Lee "Obama Girl" Ettinger, created by Ben Relles and Jake Chudnow. Videos on the channel have been seen over 3.4 billion times online. "The Key of Awesome" became the central identity of the channel.

The Key of Awesome created numerous videos covering political topics, the military, and news media. During the 2008 presidential primaries, the channel invited some of the candidates to be featured in a video, including former Senator Mike Gravel.

In October 2007, Barely Political was bought by Next New Networks for an unknown amount which in turn was acquired by YouTube in spring 2011. Herb Scannell, co-founder and CEO of Next New Networks, stated, "With Barely Political, we've added a team that can grow our reach to a very important audience — one that likes their politics with a healthy serving of humor — timed perfectly with the upcoming 2008 election season."

Its videos were mainly directed by Tom Small and feature writing and performances by Mark Douglas, Todd Womack, Doug Larsen, Anastasia Douglas, Bryan Olsen, and occasionally Lauren Francesca, Andrea Feczko, Amber Lee "Obama Girl" Ettinger, Ewan Gotfryd, Franchesca Ramsey, and Michael Stevens.

In 2014, the channel was listed on New Media Rockstars Top 100 Channels, ranked at #29.

On February 4, 2018, in the form of a song, Mark Douglas announced that he would be taking an indefinite break from YouTube, thanking his fans for their support over the years.

== Series ==
In addition to its popular Barely Productions sketches, the comedy group has multiple web series they post on their YouTube channel.

- The Key of Awesome
- Barely Guys
- Rated: Awesome
- The Anti-List
- Reggae Shark
- Barely Ads
- Boob Tattoos
- Super Therapy
- Frank Ruins Movie Trailers
- K-Stew Explains
- Barely Air
- Obama Girl
- YouTube Complaints (2012–2015)

== Response to Obama Girl ==
When asked by the Des Moines Register about the video on June 18, 2007, Obama said, "It's just one more example of the fertile imagination of the Internet. More stuff like this will be popping up all the time." Obama told the Associated Press that the Obama Girl video had upset his daughters and said, "You do wish people would think about what impact their actions have on kids and families."

== Special episodes ==
There were many cross-over episodes and specials involving appearances from other YouTube channels and characters. In January 2011, the Barely Political team did a special cross-over episode with Epic Meal Time called "Epic Mealtime Showdown of AWESOME". The episode featured key figures from both channels engaging in a Super Bowl showdown for who has the most watched channel. The episode gained over 2 million in views.

The episode featured members from The Key of Awesome: Mark Douglas, Todd Womack, Amber Lee "Obama Girl" Ettinger, Lauren Francesca, Ewan Gotfryd, Michael Stevens, Tom Small, and members from Epic Meal Time: Harley Morenstein, Dave Heuff, Tyler Lemco, Josh Elkin, and Alex Perrault.

On April 24, 2015, The Key of Awesome aired a special episode "The Muppets Destroy the Key of Awesome guys", with characters Statler and Waldorf from The Muppets made guest appearances to school Mark Douglas and Todd Womack in the art of heckling.

== See also ==
- Travis Flores

Achievements
Preceded by communitychannel	Most Subscribed Director on YouTube; Ranked 7th as of 2010	Succeeded by HappySlip
