= Ben Relles =

American businessman (b.1975)

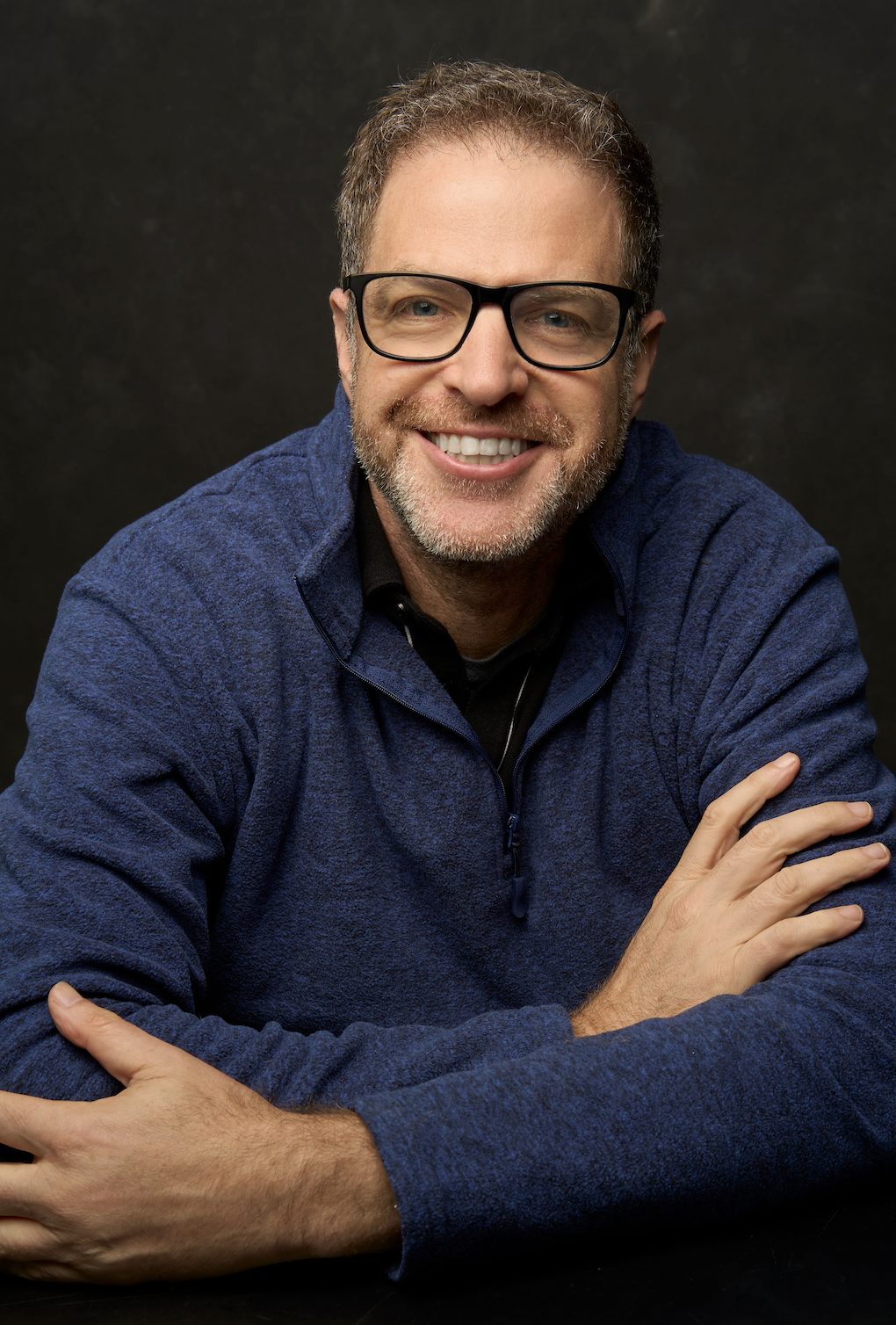
- Born: 1975 (age 50–51); Wisconsin, United States
- Education: University of Wisconsin–Madison, Wharton School of Business
- Occupation: CEO of Make Believe

Ben Relles is an entrepreneur and creator. He is the Founder and CEO of Make Believe, a company developing interactive video products and formats. His career in video started with the viral Obama Girl video in 2007.

In 2007, Relles founded the comedy channel Barely Political, whose content has been reportedly viewed over 2.5 billion times. The channel “rose to prominence” with the "Obama Girl" series of videos. During his tenure, the network’s shows included The Key of Awesome, Super Therapy, and Auto-Tune the News. He developed the Vsauce network with Michael Stevens. As of 2026, the network has a combined 7 billion views on YouTube across Vsauce1, Vsauce2, and Vsauce3.

In 2011, while serving as Vice President of Programming at Next New Networks, Relles joined YouTube when the company and the channels Relles started were acquired. In 2014, Relles joined the YouTube Originals program as Head of Comedy. In this role, he oversaw development of new content from several high-profile comedy figures, including Kevin Hart and Rhett & Link.

In 2020, Relles created the Good to Vote program to drive voter registration, and then partnered with HeadCount.org on the initiative., To date, the program has registered over 400,000 voters by working with content creators and music artists like Sabrina Carpenter, Ariana Grande and Harry Styles. The program continued for the 2022 midterms and in the 2024 election.

After his time at YouTube, Relles worked with LinkedIn co-founder Reid Hoffman. In 2024, they worked together to create Reid AI, a “digital twin” of Hoffman. Reid AI was reportedly trained on 20 years of Reid’s content, including his books, podcasts, and interviews. Relles has given keynotes alongside Reid AI at multiple events, including the 2025 Silicon Valley Video Summit. That same year, Reid AI won the Webby for Best Use of AI in Video and Film.

Relles received his MBA in Marketing from the Wharton School of Business.
