= Todd Womack =

American comedian

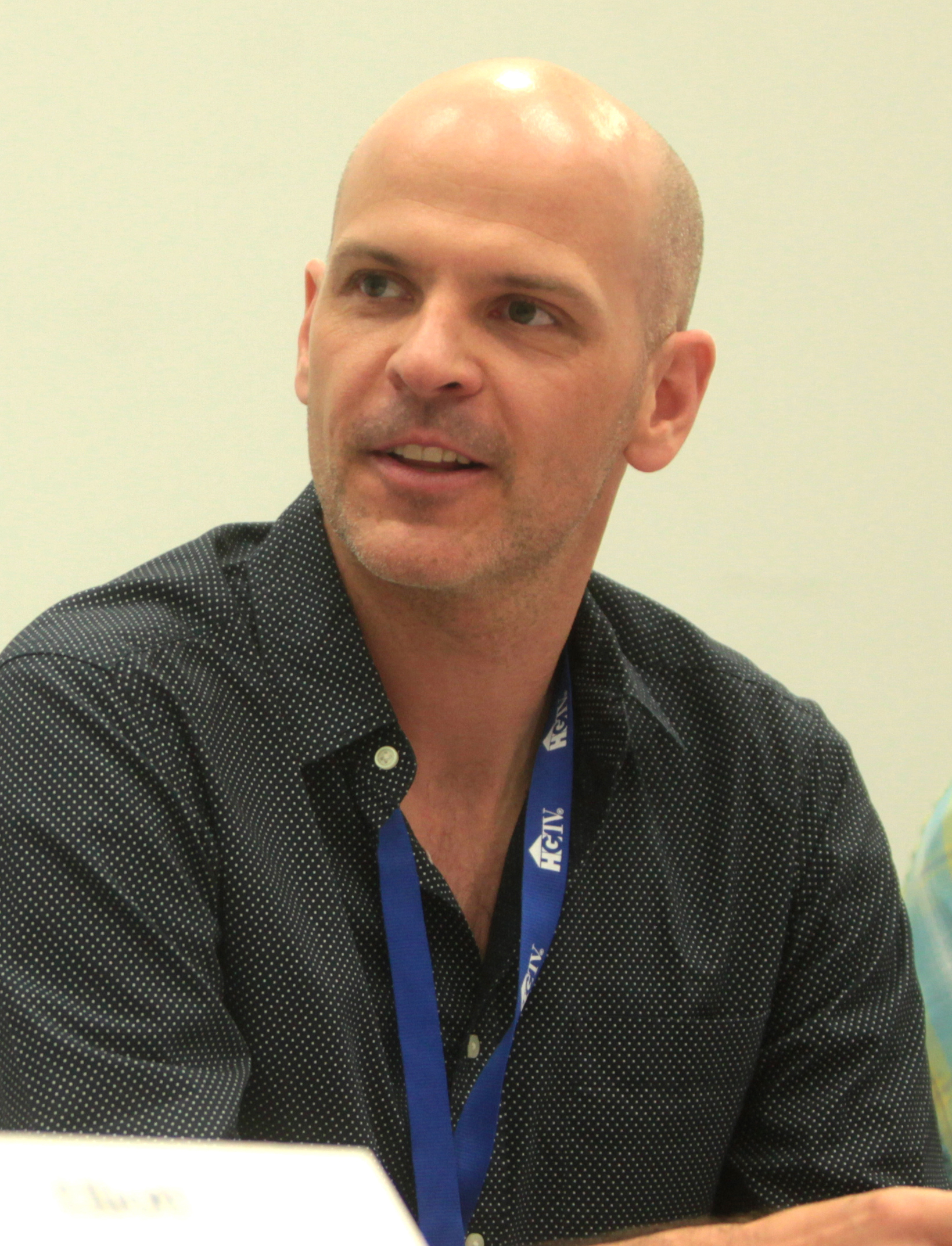
- Womack in 2014
- Born: September 1, 1975 (age 51); El Paso, Texas, U.S.
- Notable work: Barely Productions, Chappelle's Show

Comedy career
- Medium: Stand-up, sketch
- Genre: Observational comedy

Todd Womack (born September 1, 1975) is an American stand-up comedian from El Paso, Texas. He is best known for his work on the musical parody web series The Key of Awesome. From 2010 to 2015, Womack worked as a writer/performer on Barely Political/Barely Production in Brooklyn, NY. He currently lives in Austin, Texas, producing content with Rooster Teeth, and running his own film studio, "Two Films."

== Biography ==
Todd was born to David and Janet Womack, and has an older brother named Chris. He graduated from Coronado High School. He started doing comedy at the Velveeta Room in Austin, Texas in 1998. Womack also worked for Oscar Mayer, driving one of their famous Weinermobiles around the country for a year. He moved to New York City in 2000 to become a professional stand-up comedian, and eventually became a writer/performer on Barely Political, one of the biggest YouTube channels, known for its high caliber sketch comedy and The Key of Awesome, frequently using this medium to parody famous figures such as Pitbull, Dr. Phil, and Lord Voldemort.
