= Wildflower (disambiguation) =

A wildflower is a flower that grows wild.

Wildflower(s) or Wild Flower(s) may also refer to:

== Film, television, and theater ==
- Wildflower (1914 film), an American drama directed by Allan Dwan
- Wild Flowers (1989 TV film), a British drama starring Colette O'Neil and Beatie Edney
- Wildflower (1991 film), an American television film directed by Diane Keaton
- Wildflower: The Legendary California Triathlon, a documentary film about the Wildflower Triathlon (see below)
- Wildflowers (film), a 1999 American film directed by Melissa Painter
- Wild Flower (film), a 1943 Mexican film directed by Emilio Fernández
- Wild Flowers (1930 film), a Chinese film of the 1930s
- Wild Flowers (1982 film), a Canadian film directed by Jean Pierre Lefebvre
- Wild Flowers (2000 film), a Czech film directed by F. A. Brabec
- Wild Flowers (2015 film), a South Korean film directed by Park Suk-young
- Wild Flowers (2022 film), a Spanish-French film
- Wildflower (2022 film), a Canadian film
- Wildflower Film Awards, South Korea
- Wildflower (TV series), a 2017 Philippine drama series
- Wildflower (musical), a 1923 Broadway musical

== Music ==
=== Performers and events ===
- Wildflower (band), an Australian Aboriginal rock/reggae band
- The Wild Flowers, a 1983–1997 British post-punk group
- The Wilde Flowers, a 1960s English psychedelic rock band
- Wildflower! Arts and Music Festival, an annual event in Richardson, Texas, US

=== Albums ===
- Wildflower (The Avalanches album) or the title song, 2016
- Wildflower (Hank Crawford album), 1973
- Wildflower (Lauren Alaina album), 2011
- Wildflower (Sandy Lam album), 1991
- Wildflower (Sheryl Crow album) or the title song, 2005
- Wildflowers (Cassandra Vasik album) or the title song (see below), 1991
- Wildflowers (Jess & Matt album), 2021
- Wildflowers (Jonathan Byrd album) or the title song, 2001
- Wildflowers (Judy Collins album), 1967
- Wildflowers (Tom Petty album) or the title song (see below), 1994
- Wildflowers: The New York Loft Jazz Sessions, an album series with performances by various artists, 1977
- Wild Flower (Houston Person album), 1978
- Wild Flower (Hubert Laws album) or the title song, 1972
- Wildflower, by Nessly, 2018
- Wildflowers, by Connie Price and the Keystones, 2004
- Wildflowers, EP by Andrew Hyatt, 2021

=== Songs ===
- "Wildflower" (5 Seconds of Summer song), 2020
- "Wildflower" (Billie Eilish song), 2024
- "Wildflower" (Dean Brody song), 2010
- "Wildflower" (the JaneDear girls song), 2010
- "Wildflower" (Skylark song), 1973; covered by Hank Crawford (1973), Gary Morris (1986), and many others
- "Wildflower" (Superfly song), 2010
- "Wildflowers" (Cassandra Vasik song), 1992
- "Wildflowers" (Dolly Parton song), 1988
- "Wildflowers" (Tom Petty song), 1994
- "Wild Flowers" (Things of Stone and Wood song), 1994
- "Wildflower", by Beach House from Depression Cherry, 2015
- "Wildflower", by Bon Jovi from Have a Nice Day, 2005
- "Wildflower", by Cee Lo Green from The Lady Killer, 2010
- "Wildflower", by Kasey Chambers from Rattlin' Bones, 2008
- "Wildflowers", by Bradley Joseph from One Deep Breath, 2002
- "Wildflowers", by Ed Sheeran from -, 2023 (Deluxe CD edition)
- "Wild Flower", by the Cult from Electric, 1987
- "Wild Flower", by Wayne Shorter from Speak No Evil, 1966
- "Wild Flowers", by Doctor and the Medics from I Keep Thinking It's Tuesday, 1987
- "Wild Flowers", by Ryan Adams from Gold, 2001
- "Wild Flower", by RM of BTS (with Youjeen of Cherry Filter) from Indigo, 2022

== Other uses ==
- Wildflower Creek, a stream in Missouri, US
- Wildflower Triathlon, an annual triathlon at Lake San Antonio, California, US
- The Wildflowers series, a series of short novels by Andrew Neiderman writing as V. C. Andrews
- Wild Flowers: An Aid to Knowledge of our Wild Flowers and their Insect Visitors or Nature's Garden, a 1900 book by Neltje Blanchan
- Wild Flower, a fictional character in the 2005 video game Jade Empire

== See also ==
- Wylde Flowers, a 2022 farm life sim
- Wildflower Festival (disambiguation)
- Wildflower Preserve (disambiguation)
