= Elyse Willems =

Canadian internet personality, comedian, and writer

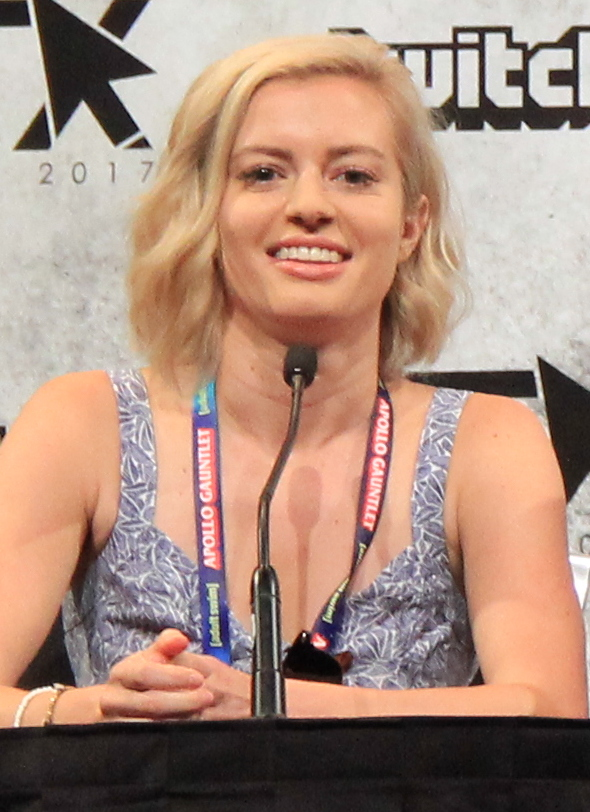
- Elyse Willems at RTX Austin 2017.
- Born: May 3, 1986 (age 40); Toronto, Ontario, Canada
- Education: University of Toronto
- Occupation: Writer • producer • performer • co-creative director
- Years active: 2013–present
- Employer: Rooster Teeth (2015-2024)
- Spouse: James Willems
- Website: elysewillems.com

Elyse Willems (born May 3, 1986) is a Canadian comedian, writer, actress, and host. She is best known for her work as a cast member and producer at Funhaus, a division of Rooster Teeth Productions, since November 2015. Since then, Willems has appeared and been involved in numerous productions by Rooster Teeth until the company went defunct in 2024.

Willems self-published her debut novel, A Night in Halloween House, which became a bestselling Halloween children's book on Amazon in October 2020.

== Life and career ==
Willems was born and raised in Toronto, Ontario in a family of Polish descent. After graduating from the University of Toronto with a Bachelor of Arts in Political Science and Government, Willems relocated to Los Angeles in January 2012. She worked at Viacom as a production assistant on GameTrailers from August 2012, later becoming a segment producer at Defy Media in 2014, where she produced, wrote and hosted Mandatory Update, a weekly comedy news show that provided a satirical commentary on the video game industry.

=== Funhaus ===
In November 2015, Willems joined Rooster Teeth as a cast member of Funhaus. There, she has collaboratively produced and co-written numerous series, such as Arizona Circle, Sex Swing, and Twits & Crits, as well as produced and performed in gaming videos and podcasts. Willems has made several appearances at RTX conventions, including a Ladies of Rooster Teeth panel at RTX Sydney 2017 where she expressed her frustration at credit for things she has done being given to her male peers in the past, and on the series Always Open, hosted by fellow Canadian Rooster Teeth member and friend Barbara Dunkelman. In 2017, a shortened clip focusing primarily on Willems from one of Funhaus' videos went viral. The clip featured Funhaus members, including her husband, jokingly criticizing a female character for wearing a ponytail while Willems, who is wearing a ponytail in the clip, reacts in the background. The clip appeared in one of PewDiePie's videos, and garnered almost fifteen million views worldwide. Willems clarified that the intent was humorous and that her reaction was deliberately comedic.

=== Other works ===
In 2020, Willems served as the series creator and one of the participants in Last Laugh, a Rooster Teeth series centered around a social experiment where twelve contestants spent six hours in one room while trying to make each other laugh or smile. Willems also streams with her husband James in order to fundraise for various charities and causes, and is among the popular streamers who raised funds for The Jimmy Fund to support research at Dana–Farber Cancer Institute on November 1, 2020.

Willems self-published her first novel, titled A Night in Halloween House, in October 2020. It was released on Amazon in both paperback and Kindle editions, and became the bestselling Halloween children's book. In 2021, she and James were credited as writers for IllFonic's Arcadegeddon.

After Rooster Teeth and, by extension, Funhaus shut down in 2024, Willems has been involved in multiple programs for PBS and video game writing projects.

== Personal life ==
Willems is married to fellow performer and Funhaus cast member James Willems, and they live in Los Angeles, California.

== Filmography ==
=== Film ===
Year	Title	Role	Notes
2018	Haus of Pain		Documentary
2018	Blood Fest	Selfie Attendee	Cameo
2024	Wheelchair Club	Waitress	
2025	Total Party Kill	Deanna	
2025	We're All Gonna Die	Tik Tok influencer	

=== Web series ===
Year	Title	Role	Notes
2014–2015	Mandatory Update	Herself	Co-host, co-creator
2015–2024	Funhaus	Elyse / Herself	Performer, director, producer
2015–2016	On the Spot	Herself	Guest
2016–2020	Always Open	Herself	Guest
2016	Red vs. Blue	Cherry	2 episodes
2017	The Eleven Little Roosters	Agent Knuckle	6 episodes
2017	Sex Swing	TV Anchor / Mermaid Princess / Hanako	3 episodes
2017	Million Dollars, But...	Herself	Guest
2017–2019	Off Topic	Herself	Guest
2017–2019	Sugar Pine 7	Elyse / Elliot / Elantra	26 episodes
2017	Camp Camp	Mrs. Nurfington	Episode: "Parent's Day"
2018	Hardcore Tabletop	Herself	Referee
2018	Murder Room	Herself	Guest
2018–2019	Arizona Circle	Elyse	Actress, writer, producer
2019, 2022, 2024, 2025, 2026	Smosh	Elyse	"Try not to Laugh" "Board AF"
2020–2023	Last Laugh	Herself	Series creator, contestant (season 1), co-host (season 2)
2021, 2025	Drawtectives	Harvey Hornswoggle	Guest
2022	Popcorn & Shield	Host	7 Episodes
2022	KOLLOK	Clarity Seven	Actress
2022	Dungeons & Daddies	Erica Drippins	Guest
2022-	30 Morbid Minutes	Host	123 Episodes
2022-2024	Must Be Dice	Sloane Baker / Cordelia Gruselig / Neville Shortpants / Barbie	25 Episodes
2023	Dad Then There Were None	Dorothy Brady	3 Episodes
2023	Stinky Dragon Adventures	Iron Golem #1	Episode: "The One-Armed Archer"
2024	Um, Actually	contestant	Season 9, Episode 6
2024 -	Won't You Be My Gamer?	Host	PBS Infotainment Series, 53 Episodes
2025	How Are We Today?	Barry the Beaver	PBS Sitcom
2025	Answer For It!	Host	30 Episodes
2025	Smosh Summer Games: Class of 2005	Secret Lunch Lady	1 Episode - Finale

=== Video games ===
Year	Title	Role	Notes
2020	Predator: Hunting Grounds	Soldier	Voice role
2021	Arcadegeddon	Ruck	Voice role, writer
2021	Psychonauts 2	Rich Mom	Voice role
2022	Ghostbusters: Spirits Unleashed		writer
2024	Killer Klowns from Outer Space: The Game		Additional material
2026	Halloween: The Game		Writer
