= Let's Play Live =

Live tour of video gaming performances

- Status: Defunct
- Genre: Gaming, internet, content creation
- Country: United States
- Years active: 7
- Inaugurated: February 20, 2015
- Most recent: April 3, 2022
- Organizer: Rooster Teeth

Let's Play Live, named Achievement Hunter Live during its last two tours, was a touring Let's Play show that featured video games and internet personalities. Let's Play Live grew out of Rooster Teeth's gaming division, Achievement Hunter, and became a collaboration with multiple channels including members of the Let's Play family: Funhaus, ScrewAttack, Kinda Funny, Cow Chop, and The Creatures.

== Tours ==
Everyone who has ever lived has wanted to be a rock star ... since talent is required, that's not going to happen. So this is the next best thing.

— Geoff Ramsey, Let's Play Creative Director and co-founder of Rooster Teeth

Described by organizer Geoff Ramsey as, "the new-media equivalent of a concert or sporting event," LPL recreated web videos his company is best known for, playing video games in a humorous manner to a live audience.

Let's Play Live originated in Austin, Texas in 2015 featuring six Achievement Hunter personalities: Geoff Ramsey, Jack Pattillo, Ryan Haywood, Michael Jones, Gavin Free and Ray Narvaez, Jr. Drawing comparison to DigiTour Media, the first Let's Play Live took place at the Moody Theater on February 20, 2015.

Let's Play Live sold out shows at Chicago's Chicago Theatre, New York City, and Los Angeles' Dolby Theatre in 2016. The NYC LPL took place during the 2016 New York Comic Con in the Hammerstein Ballroom and was broadcast live to over 240 theaters across the country in collaboration with Fathom Events. In explaining its appeal, one reviewer noted that knowing the game was irrelevant, the interest came from, "watching the real people on stage react to video games – often in angry, hilarious ways I can relate to".

From April 24–30, 2017 Let's Play Live toured through Newark, New Jersey, Baltimore, Orlando, Florida and Tampa, Florida and featured members of Achievement Hunter and Funhaus.

LPL returned to Austin the night before RTX 2018 began.

In August 2018, Rooster Teeth announced they would replace RTX Sydney 2019 with three Let's Play Live events in different Australian cities. Achievement Hunter traveled to Australia to perform Let's Play Live as Achievement Hunter Live from January 23–27, 2019 in Sydney, Melbourne, and Perth. Another show occurred as part of RTX Austin 2019.

Achievement Hunter Live West Coast Tour was scheduled to run from March 13–20, 2020 in Los Angeles, Seattle, and San Francisco. It has since been postponed due to the coronavirus pandemic. On January 28, 2021, Achievement Hunter announced that the rescheduled tour dates have been cancelled due to COVID-19 concerns with plans to reschedule after the pandemic.

=== Tour dates ===
Date	Name	Location	Associated act(s)
February 20, 2015	Let's Play Live!	Austin, Texas	Funhaus
June 17, 2016	Let's Play Live! 2	Hollywood, California	Funhaus, ScrewAttack, Kinda Funny, Cow Chop and The Creatures
August 19, 2016	Let's Play Live: Chicago	Chicago, Illinois	Funhaus, Kinda Funny and The Creatures
October 8, 2016	Let's Play Live: New York	New York City, New York	Funhaus and Cow Chop
April 24, 2017	Lets Play Live! East Coast Tour	Newark, New Jersey	Funhaus
April 26, 2017	Lets Play Live! East Coast Tour	Baltimore, Maryland	Funhaus
April 28, 2017	Lets Play Live! East Coast Tour	Orlando, Florida	Funhaus
April 30, 2017	Lets Play Live! East Coast Tour	Tampa, Florida	Funhaus
August 2, 2018	Lets Play Live! RTX Austin	Austin, Texas	Funhaus
January 23, 2019	Achievement Hunter Live	Sydney, Australia	Achievement Hunter
January 25, 2019	Achievement Hunter Live	Melbourne, Australia	Achievement Hunter
January 27, 2019	Achievement Hunter Live	Perth, Australia	Achievement Hunter
July 4, 2019	Achievement Hunter Live	Austin, Texas	Achievement Hunter
March 31, 2022	Achievement Hunter Live West Coast Tour	Seattle, Washington	Achievement Hunter
April 2, 2022	Achievement Hunter Live West Coast Tour	San Francisco, California	Achievement Hunter
April 3, 2022	Achievement Hunter Live West Coast Tour	Los Angeles, California	Achievement Hunter

== Documentary ==
Let's Play Live: The Documentary is a behind-the-scenes look at the inaugural event and was released September 14, 2015 to First sponsors. It has been called, "the origin story of the next generation of movie stars and rock bands."

== See also ==
- RTX, an internet and gaming event spanning three continents
