= Wildflower Festival =

Wildflower Festival (or Wild Flower Festival) may refer to one of these annual events:

- Kings Park Festival, an annual September festival in Western Australia, formerly known as Perth's Wildflower Festival
- Wildflower Festival, an annual May event that includes the Wildflower Triathlon in California
- Wildflower! Arts and Music Festival, an annual spring festival held in Richardson, Texas
- Crested Butte Wildflower Festival, an annual July festival in Crested Butte, Colorado
- Great Smokies Wildflower Pilgrimage, a week-long annual April event in the Great Smoky Mountains National Park

== See also ==
- Wildflower (disambiguation)
