= The Killdares =

American celtic rock group

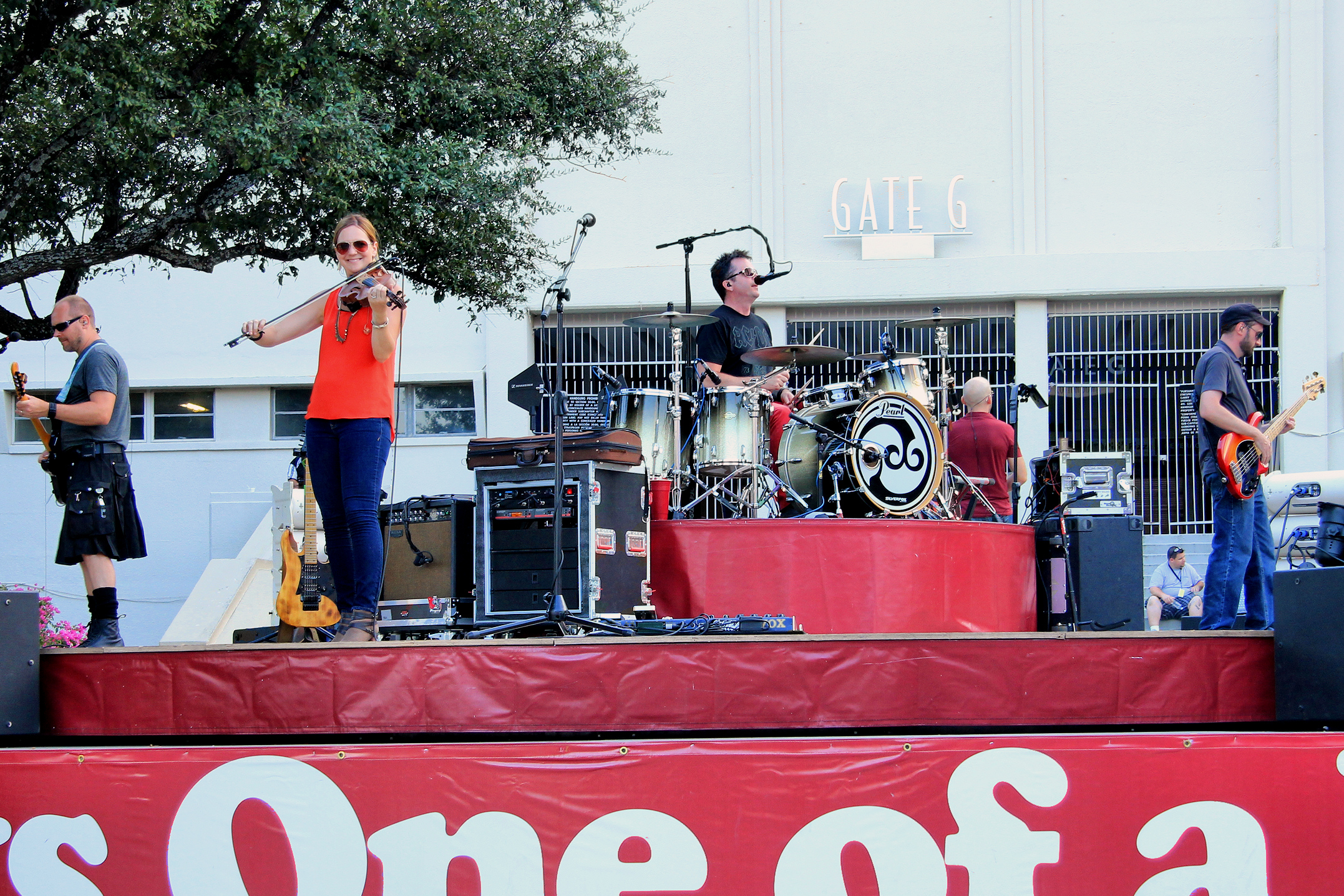
- The Killdares at the 2014 State Fair of Texas

Background information
- Origin: Dallas, Texas
- Genres: Celtic rock
- Years active: 1996 – 2016
- Label: None
- Members: Tim Smith; Roberta Rast; Matt Willis; Gary Thorne; Mike Urness
- Past members: Jim Dawson; James Dunning; Stacy Edwards; Jeff Fentum; Roy Fletcher; Jim Folstad; Troy Gallaher; Brek Lancaster; Wes Lorber; Jesse Owsley; Ann Purdy; Linda Relph; Ed Walewski; Chris Leland
- Website: http://www.killdares.com

The Killdares were a Dallas celtic rock group formed in 1996. The group released five studio albums and two live music projects; the live CD LIVE from 2002 and live DVD/dual CD combo Up Against the Lights in 2010. The Killdares played many local Dallas–Fort Worth metroplex festivals, including Taste Addison, MayFest, Texas Scottish Festival and Highland Games, Wildflower! Arts and Music Festival, and Grapefest, and were featured at the State Fair of Texas for seventeen years. The band retired in November 2016 after 20 years of performing.

== History ==
=== 1996-1998: Broken with a Word ===
The Killdares were founded in 1996 by lead singer and drummer Tim Smith, along with former members Jesse Owsley, Ann Purdy and fiddler Linda Relph. Owsley and Purdy left within the first year, while Relph was with the band until 2002. In 1998, the band released their self-produced debut CD, Broken With A Word

=== 1999-2002: A Place to Stand and LIVE ===
In 2001 The Killdares released A Place To Stand, which was produced by Chris Bell. This album would be submitted in 2001 for Grammy nominations in 5 categories.

The Killdares released their third CD in the middle of the 2002. Titled LIVE, this album songs from their live set list, including cover versions of songs from Big Country, Fairport Convention, and The Ramones.

=== 2002-2004: Transitions ===
In 2002 six-time National Fiddle Champion Roberta Rast joined the band. More changes to the lineup would occur in mid-2004 with the addition of James Dunning on rhythm guitar and backing vocals, Stacy Edwards on bass guitar, and Brek Lancaster on lead guitar. Matt Willis joined the band on highland bagpipes in September 2004.

=== 2005-2009: Any Given Element and Secrets of the Day ===
In 2005, James Dunning left the band to form Lost Immigrants, but his song-writing was prominently featured on The Killdares' fourth album Any Given Element (2005). In mid-2005, Jim Dawson joined the band on bass guitar. This lineup, Tim Smith on lead vocals and drums, Roberta Rast on fiddle and ukulele, Brek Lancaster on lead guitar, Matt Willis on bagpipes and whistles, and Jim Dawson on bass guitar, would go on to record both Any Given Element (2005) and Secrets of the Day (2008).

For Secrets of the Day (2008), The Killdares again worked with producer Ronan Chris Murphy and engineer Chris Bell. The Killdares released Secrets of the Day in July 2008 at The House of Blues (Dallas). The album has been submitted for multiple Grammy nominations in six categories including Album of the Year, Best Rock Instrumental, and Contemporary Folk Album.

In 2009, Troy Gallaher would be featured on bass.

=== 2010: Up Against the Lights ===
In 2010–11, the lineup only included four members, with the bass position being filled by special guest players. Gavin Kelso would play bass from January 2010 through April 2011. From April 2011 to present, The Killdares have featured Gary Thorne of the Denton-based band Shaolin Death Squad on bass guitar.

On July 30, 2010, The Killdares filmed a live concert at the historic Granada Theater in Dallas, TX. The project became a live dual CD and DVD titled Up Against the Lights, featuring the same members as in 2010, Tim Smith on lead vocals and drums, Roberta Rast on fiddle and backing vocals, Brek Lancaster on lead guitar and backing vocals, Matt Willis on various bagpipes and backing vocals, and Gavin Kelso listed as a special guest on bass guitar. The dual CD/DVD was released on November 4 at the Angelika Theater in Dallas, TX with a viewing of the DVD on the big screen.

=== 2011-2015: Steal the Sky ===
Bass player Gary Thorne of the Denton-based band Shaolin Death Squad began playing with the band in the middle of 2011. In June 2013, long-time guitarist Brek Lancaster stepped down and was succeeded by Mike Urness, a guitarist from Denton, TX.

On September 24, 2014, The Killdares released their seventh album and fifth studio album Steal the Sky. The album was released at a concert at the Granada Theater, where their previous CD/DVD had been recorded.

=== 2016: 20th Anniversary and Retiring ===
In January 2016, The Killdares announced they were celebrating their 20th year as a band, and retiring at the end of the year. Their final show was held at the Kessler Theater on November 18, 2016. Former members Brek Lancaster and James Dunning had brief featured sections during this farewell show.

== Discography ==
- Broken with a Word (1998)
- A Place to Stand (2001)
- LIVE (2002)
- Any Given Element (2005)
- Secrets of the Day (2008)
- Up Against the Lights (2010)
- Steal the Sky (2014)

== Videography ==
- Up Against the Lights (2010)
