= Wildflower Preserve =

Wildflower Preserve may refer to:

- Wildflower Preserve (Florida), an 80-acre preserve on the Cape Haze peninsula in Charlotte County
- Missimer Wildflower Preserve, a protected native grassland in Napa County, California
- Bowman's Hill Wildflower Preserve, a nature preserve, botanical garden and museum
- Van Hoosear Wildflower Preserve, a private nature reserve on Carriger Creek in southern Sonoma County, California
- Cylburn Arboretum, formerly the Cylburn Wildflower Preserve and Garden Center from 1954 until 1982
- Ridges Sanctuary, a 16,00 acre wildflower preserve in Baileys Harbor, Wisconsin
- Holtwood Arboretum, a recreation area, arboretum, and wildflower preserve located on New Village Road (off Route 372), in Lancaster County, Holtwood, Pennsylvania
- Sand Ridge Wildflower Preserve
- Todmorden Mills Wildflower Preserve
- Slaterville Wildflower Preserve
- Van Hoosear Wildflower Preserve
- Shenks Ferry Wildflower Preserve
- Stonebrook, a documented pre-glacial Missouri wildflower preserve
