= Wildflower! Arts and Music Festival =

- Dates: 20–22 May 2022
- Location: Richardson, Texas
- Years active: 1993–2019, 2022–
- Website: www.wildflowerfestival.com

The Wildflower! Arts and Music Festival is an event held annually in Richardson, Texas, and typically has a turn out of about 70,000 people. It began in 1993 as a small community event held in a local park in Northeast Richardson, Texas, and got its name from the March through May celebration season when wildflowers blossom throughout the city. Having just celebrated its 23rd anniversary in 2015, Wildflower! is now a three-day event that has grown to become one of North Texas’ most recognized and anticipated music festivals. The name Wildflower!, when referring to the festival, is always spelled with an exclamation point.

Produced and managed by the city of Richardson, Wildflower! is located north of Dallas at Galatyn Parkway and US 75. Festival programming includes four outdoor and two indoor performance stages featuring local, regional and headliner bands, the WF! Kids, strolling entertainers and buskers in Performance Row, interactive displays and exhibits, the WF! Marketplace, the award-winning Performing Songwriter Contest and Stage, the Battle of the Bands competition, the Art Guitar Auction, the Budding Talent Competition, and festival foods.

== History ==
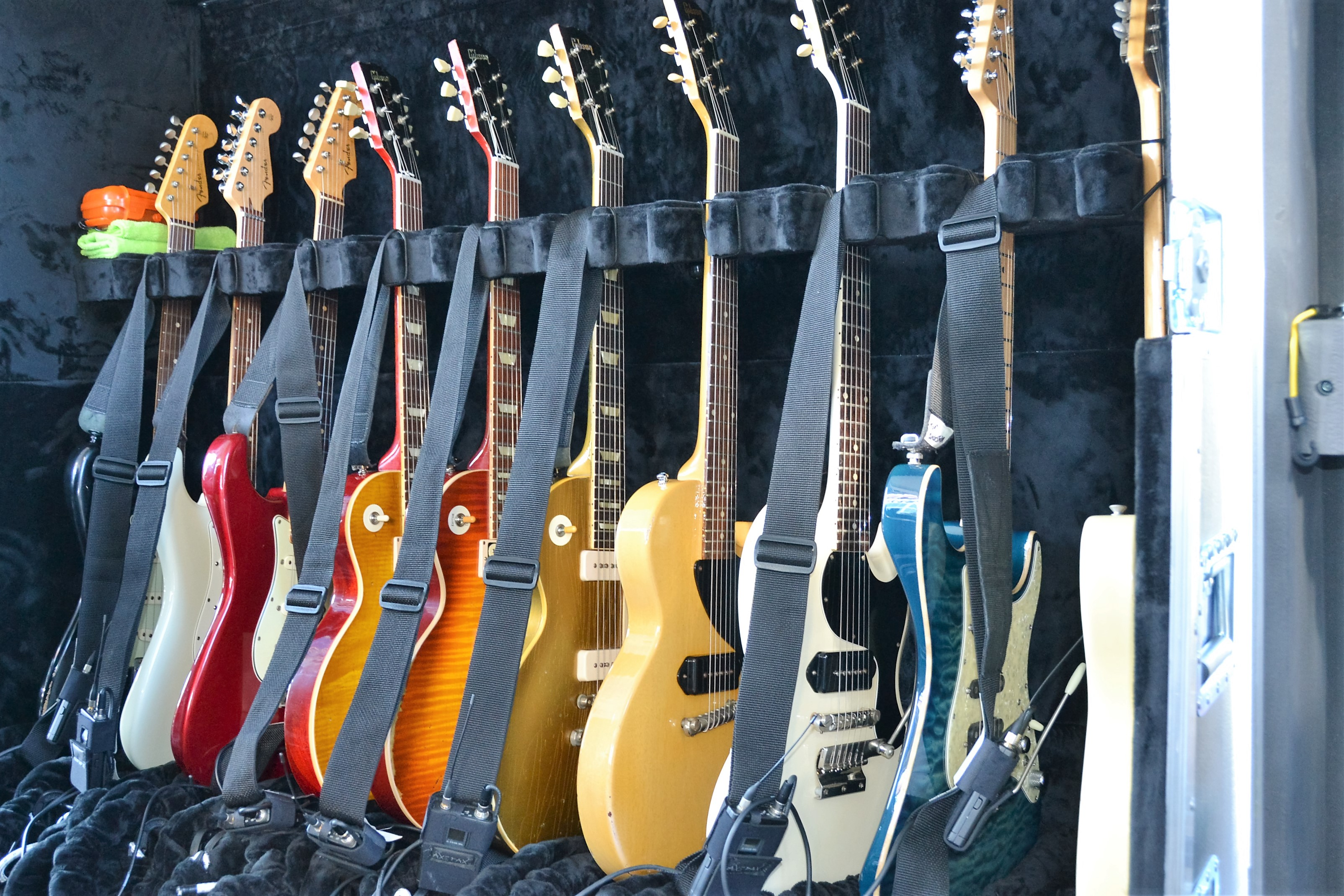
Wildflower! Arts and Music Festival - backstage on the State Farm Amphitheater Stage, open guitar vault pre-show

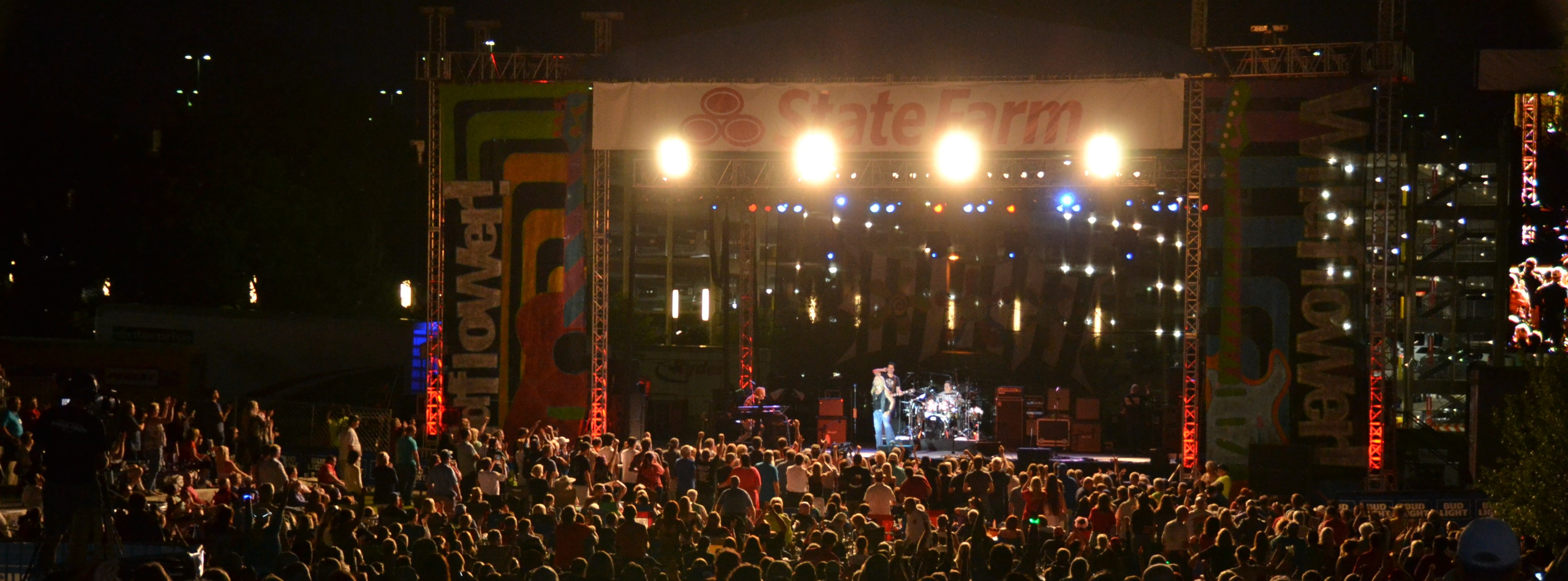
State Farm Amphitheater Stage at Wildflower! Arts and Music Festival

The festival began as a springtime community event to celebrate the wild flowers planted throughout the city. Wildflower! grew in popularity in 1995 when headliner bands were added.

Growing crowds and subsequent logistical challenges led the festival to its first move from Breckinridge Park to the Greenway Corporate Office Park at US75 and Campbell Road. It was there that the event was able to expand to three days and eventually grew to cover over 30 acres (120,000 m^{2}) featuring multiple stages, arts, music, exhibits, and family activities.

The event became too large for where it was hosted, and the event moved in 2002 to its present location, the Galatyn Park Urban Center. With its new home, the festival was now able to host the Eisemann Center for Performing Arts, a festival plaza, a DART light rail station, the AMLI Galatyn Station Luxury Apartments, the Renaissance Hotel and use of the greenway space belonging to State Farm.

== Lineups ==
Year	Performers
2017	The B-52s, X Ambassadors, Guster, Martha Davis and the Motels, John Christopher Davis, 2-Bit Palomino, Ryanhood, Graceland Ninjaz, John Fullbright, Lynyrd Skynyrd, Night Ranger, Orleans, The All-American Rejects, Bowling for Soup, Justin Farren, Rj Cowdery, Butch Hancock, Beth Wood, Joe Crookston, Albert and Gage, A Hard Night’s Day, Shake Russell and Michael Hearne with Mike Roberts, Shooter Jennings, The Outlaws, Ruthie Foster, The Flyin’ A’s
2016	Peter Frampton, Toadies, Hoobastank, John Mayall, Dennis DeYoung and the Music of Styx, John Waite, Alien Ant Farm, Soul Asylum, The Guess Who, Survivor, Finger Eleven, Black Joe Lewis, Jimmie Vaughan and The Tilt-A-Whirl Band featuring Lou Ann Barton, Asia Featuring John Payne, Adrian Johnston, A Hard Day's Night, Alex Marie Brinkley, Bethel Steele, Bill Ward & 2-Bit Palomino, Billy Crockett, Buffalo Ruckus, Chase Gassaway, Cheers for Tears, Choctaw Wildfire, Claire Morales, Crystal Yates, Drew Kennedy, DUELL, Eddie Lott, Eliza Gilkyson, Forever Mac, Grace Morrison, Griffin Tucker, Hares on the Mountain, Hello Lover, Ian Dickson, Jagged Row, Joe Tucker, Julie Jean White, Julie Livingston, Justin Farren, Katie Stump, La Pompe, Le Freak, Laura Harrell, Love Past Blue, Melody Guy, Orcanaut, Pearl Gem, Raised Right Men, Rania Khoury, Rebecca Folsom, Slaid Cleaves, Susan Cattaneo, Susan Gibson, Swan Song, Terri Hendrix and Lloyd Maines, The Bodarks, The KUL, The McCleods, The Sideshow Tragedy, The Tu-Tones, Troy Werner and Unwritten Law
2015	Pat Benatar & Neil Giraldo, Kansas, Blue October, Everclear, .38 Special, Wynonna & The Big Noise, Fuel, Tonic, The Smithereens, Leon Russell, Minus The Bear, Gary P. Nunn, The Joe Ely Band, Trout Fishing In America, Max Stalling, Zane Williams Band, Susan Werner, Zepparella - a tribute to Led Zeppelin, and Le Freak.
2014	Cheap Trick, Joan Jett and the Blackhearts, The Wallflowers, Kool and The Gang, Lonestar, Ed Kowalczyk of Live, Loverboy, Jack Ingram, Vertical Horizon, Fastball, Foghat, Michael Martin Murphey, Hal Ketchum, Jonathan Tyler & The Northern Lights, Marcia Ball, Marc Broussard, Max Stalling, The Soft White Sixties, Le Freak, and The Rod Experience.
2013	Charlie Daniels Band, 38 Special, The Toadies, Gretchen Wilson, Grand Funk Railroad, Robert Earl Keen, Uncle Kracker, Blue Öyster Cult, Spin Doctors, Reverend Horton Heat, Cowboy Mouth, Ray Wylie Hubbard, Eleven Hundred Springs, Slaid Cleaves, Le Freak, Eliza Gilkyson, Terri Hendrix with Lloyd Maines, Jolie Holliday, Rocket Man - the Best of Elton John, The Waymores
2012	Joe Walsh, Nelly, The Commodores, Dashboard Confessional, Lou Gramm - the Voice of Foreigner, Chic with Nile Rodgers, Mark Chesnutt, Guy Clark, Neal McCoy, Augustana, Beth Nielsen Chapman, AbbaMania - the Abba Tribute, Le Freak, John Gorka, Shaeleigh, Hard Nights Day, Jolie Holliday, Sara Hickman
2011	REO Speedwagon, Whitesnake, The Guess Who, Jerry Lee Lewis, Jack Ingram, Fuel (band), Cracker, Lit, Seven Mary Three, Sister Hazel, Better Than Ezra, Little River Band, Sara Hickman, Roger Creager, Joe Ely, Frontiers – the Journey Tribute Band, Rotel and the Hot Tomatoes, and Night Fever – The Bee Gees Tribute
2010	The B-52s, Vince Neil (of Mötley Crüe), .38 Special, Candlebox, Los Lonely Boys, Carolina Liar, Toad The Wet Sprocket, Bowling For Soup, Mutemath, Sweet, Cowboy Mouth, Delbert McClinton, Rio Grand, Slaid Cleaves, The Laws, Eliza Gilkyson, Le Freak, Frontiers – The Journey Tribute Band, Casey James, and Hard Night's Day
2009	Kansas, The Toadies, Rick Springfield, Kool & The Gang, Robert Randolph & The Family Band, Hoobastank, Night Ranger, Tonic, Jackopierce, The Wailers, Edgar Winter, Badfish, The Killdares, The Spazmatics, Le Freak, John Gorka, David Wilcox, Vance Gilbert, and Kraig Parker
2008	Pat Benatar and Neil Giraldo, Bret Michaels' Rock of Love Tour, America, Everclear, The Guess Who, Loverboy, Jerry Jeff Walker, Blue Öyster Cult, Kathy Mattea, Eve 6, Roger Creager, FireHouse, Seven Mary Three, Quietdrive, Ray Wylie Hubbard, Butch Hancock, Django Walker, Candy Coburn, No Justice, Slaid Cleaves, Jon Vezner, Steve Fromholz, Chris Smither, and Paramount's LaserSpectacular featuring the music of Pink Floyd
2007	Grand Funk Railroad, Better Than Ezra, Morris Day and the Time, Fastball, Jo Dee Messina, Foghat, Shooter Jennings, The Original Family Stone, Chuck Negron, Soul Asylum, The Romantics, Eddie Money, John Waite, Tracy Byrd, Austin Lounge Lizards, Paramount’s LaserSpectacular featuring the music of Pink Floyd, Le Freak
2006	K.C. and the Sunshine Band, Bowling For Soup, Joan Jett and the Blackhearts, The Spinners, Loverboy, Gregg Rolie, Jonny Lang, Cowboy Mouth, The Click Five, Lisa Loeb, Shawn Colvin, The Vanished, The Knack, Jimmie Vaughan, Ruthie Foster, The Bat Mastersons, Minority
2005	Cheap Trick, The Neville Brothers, Julie Roberts, Miranda Lambert, Rick Springfield, Darryl Worley, Leon Russell, Ryan Cabrera, Dirty Dozen Brass Band, Cowboy Mouth, Bugs Henderson, Joe Ely, Mickey Thomas of Starship, Pure Prairie League, Minority
2004	Paul Rodgers, Gin Blossoms, Blues Traveler, Tanya Tucker, The Polyphonic Spree, Brian McComas, Cherry Poppin' Daddies, Blue Öyster Cult, The Classical Mystery Tour, Ken Navarro, Chris Duarte, Stephanie Urbina Jones, Ruthie Foster, Minority
2003	Peter Frampton, Morris Day and the Time, Smash Mouth, Taylor Dayne, Roberta Flack, Joe Bonamassa, Nine Days, Jonny Lang, The Smithereens, Fattburger, Cathy Richardson Band, Big Bad Voodoo Daddy, Chuck Negron, Big Brother and the Holding Company, The Old 97s, The Kingston Trio, The Marshall Tucker Band, Shemekia Copeland, Steve Azar
2002	(one-day festival) Wilson Pickett, Colin Haye, Southern Culture on the Skids, Trout Fishing in America
2001	America, Collective Soul, The Go-Go's, The Doobie Brothers, En Vogue, Hank Williams Jr., Grand Funk Railroad, Flock of Seagulls, The Kentucky Headhunters, Cowboy Mouth, John Cafferty & The Beaver Brown Band, Shawn Mullins, Sam Moore, Percy Sledge, The Romantics, Splender, Sugarbomb, Loverboy, Nitty Gritty Dirt Band
2000	The Bacon Brothers, A.J. Croce, Isaac Hayes, Don McLean, Electric Light Orchestra, Bruce Hornsby, War, Steven Bishop, Neal McCoy
1999	The Beach Boys, David Clayton Thomas, Huey Lewis & The News, Kenny Loggins, Sister Hazel, Robert Cray, Spin Doctors, The Commodores, The Bat Mastersons
1998	Dan Fogelberg, Kansas, Christopher Cross
1997	The 5th Dimension, Loverboy, .38 Special, Creedence Clearwater Revisited, David Kersh, Eddie Money, Marty Stuart, Survivor, Randy Bachman
