= Carriger Creek (Sonoma County, California) =

Stream in Sonoma County, California

Location
- Country: United States
- State: California
- Region: Sonoma County
- City: El Verano, California

Physical characteristics
- Source: Sonoma Mountain
  - location: 4 mi (6 km) southwest of Glen Ellen, California
  - coordinates: 38°19′34″N 122°34′24″W
  - elevation: 2,160 ft (660 m)
- Mouth: Fowler Creek (below)
  - coordinates: 38°16′0″N 122°28′33″W
  - elevation: 49 ft (15 m)

Basin features
- Tributaries
  - right: Felder Creek

Fowler Creek
- Location of the mouth in California

Location
- Country: United States
- State: California
- Region: Sonoma County

Physical characteristics
- Source: Carriger Creek (above)
  - location: south of Sonoma, California
  - coordinates: 38°16′0″N 122°28′33″W
  - elevation: 49 ft (15 m)
- Mouth: Sonoma Creek
  - location: 3 mi (5 km) south of Sonoma, California
  - coordinates: 38°14′28″N 122°27′9″W
  - elevation: 20 ft (6.1 m)

Basin features
- Tributaries
  - right: Rodgers Creek

Carriger Creek is a stream Sonoma County, California. Southwest of the city of Sonoma, California, its name changes to Fowler Creek. This article covers both parts of the creek.

Carriger Creek springs from the eastern slope of Sonoma Mountain, 4 mi (6 km) southwest of Glen Ellen. It flows southwest through a 3 mi (5 km) canyon that opens west of El Verano. In the Sonoma Valley, it joins with Felder Creek just north of West Watmaugh Road and becomes Fowler Creek. Fowler Creek parallels State Route 12 south, joined by Rodgers Creek along the way. It flows into Sonoma Creek just north of State Route 121. Its waters reach the Napa Sonoma Marsh and San Pablo Bay by way of Sonoma Creek.

== Ecology ==
Carriger Creek is studied by the Sonoma Ecology Center and the Southern Sonoma County Resource Conservation District. Steelhead migration and spawning occur in Carriger Creek. Ongoing stream bank stabilization and riparian revegetation is being conducted in the creek to prevent erosion and enhance fish and wildlife habitat. The major correction required was compensation for a poorly conceived concrete ford historically constructed for access to the Van Hoosear Wildflower Preserve; this concrete structure led to severe downstream downcutting and resultant denial of fish passage. According to the U.S. Environmental Protection Agency, Carriger Creek was a "renowned steelhead fishery" prior to the ecological damage of human modification of the streambed. Besides eliminating the downcutting by creating a fish ladder, restoration work will also result in use of rip-rap for certain streambank stabilization.

== See also ==
- List of watercourses in the San Francisco Bay Area
