= RTX (event) =

Video game convention

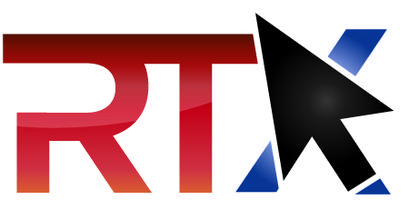
- Status: Inactive
- Genre: Gaming, internet, content creation
- Venue: Austin Convention Center (2012–2023)
- Location: Austin, Texas
- Country: United States
- Years active: 10
- Inaugurated: May 27–29, 2011
- Most recent: July 7–9, 2023
- Attendance: ~600 (2011); ~5000 (2012); ~10,000 (2013); ~30,000 (2014); ~45,000 (2015); ~60,000 (2016); ~62,000 (2017); ~65,000 (2018)
- Organizer: Rooster Teeth
- Sponsor: Pizza Hut (2015–2016)
- Website: Official website

RTX was a series of annual gaming and Internet conventions created by Rooster Teeth held primarily in Austin, Texas and for a period of time also Sydney, New South Wales, Australia and London, England, UK.

Starting as a small community gathering of 600 people in 2011, RTX significantly expanded in its following years, housing an estimated 62,000 people in 2017. RTX gained attention for its "celebration of that convergence of gaming and Internet culture." In 2016, Tech Crunch described it as "SXSW meets Comic Con." The event included panels on gaming and internet topics, exhibitor booths from independent and major game developers, as well as meet and greets with game developers, Rooster Teeth employees, and internet personalities. RTX was also notable for being one of the first places consumers could play major video game releases such as Halo 4 and Rainbow Six: Siege.

In December 2023, Rooster Teeth GM Jordan Levin announced the cancelation of RTX 2024, due to "never being profitable" as well as extended renovations to the Austin Convention Center.

== History ==
RTX was announced 16 February 2011 and the inaugural event was meant to be for 200 people. However, minutes after tickets went on sale the community managed to buy more tickets than originally planned to be sold, accidentally selling over 500 tickets.

=== RTX 2011 ===
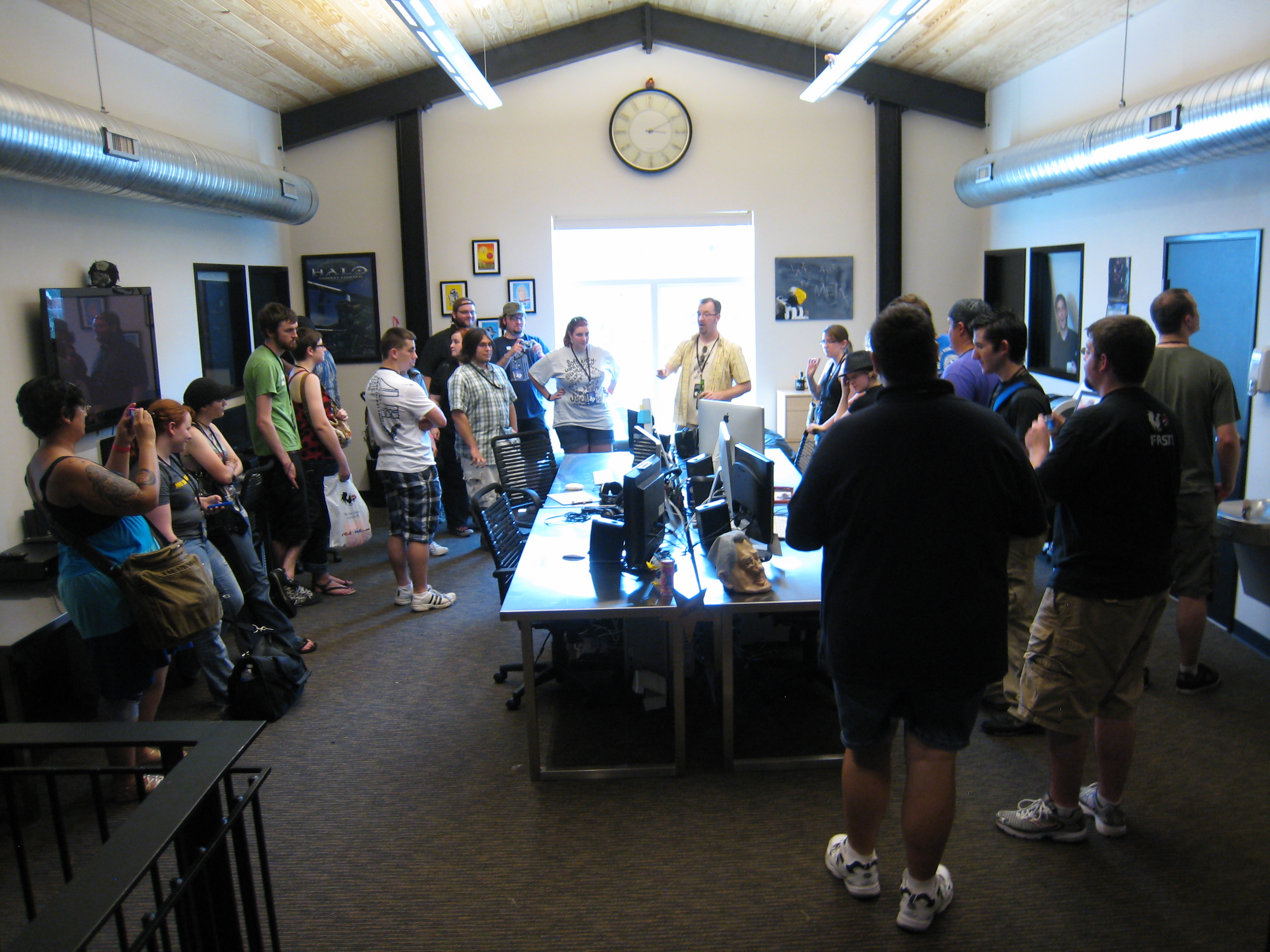
Achievement Hunter host Jack Pattillo guides RTX 2011 attendees on a tour of the Rooster Teeth offices.

RTX 2011 was the first official convention for Rooster Teeth fans. It was held from 27 to 29 May. Attendees were treated to a tour of the office, an exclusive T-shirt and the chance to take part in a special episode of the Rooster Teeth series, Immersion. The convention was deemed a success, and RTX became an annual event.

=== RTX 2012 ===
After the success of RTX 2011, RTX 2012 expanded significantly with 4,500 attendees. RTX 2012 was held from 7–8 July at the Austin Convention Center, and was treated as more of a traditional gaming convention, introducing features such as an exhibit hall which included exhibitor booths from gaming and internet personalities and companies, various panels, and the first publicly playable demo of Halo 4. 343 Industries also showed off forge in Halo 4 for the first time. Similarly to the previous year, RTX attendees had the chance to take part as extras in the upcoming Rooster Teeth series Day Five.

=== RTX 2013 ===
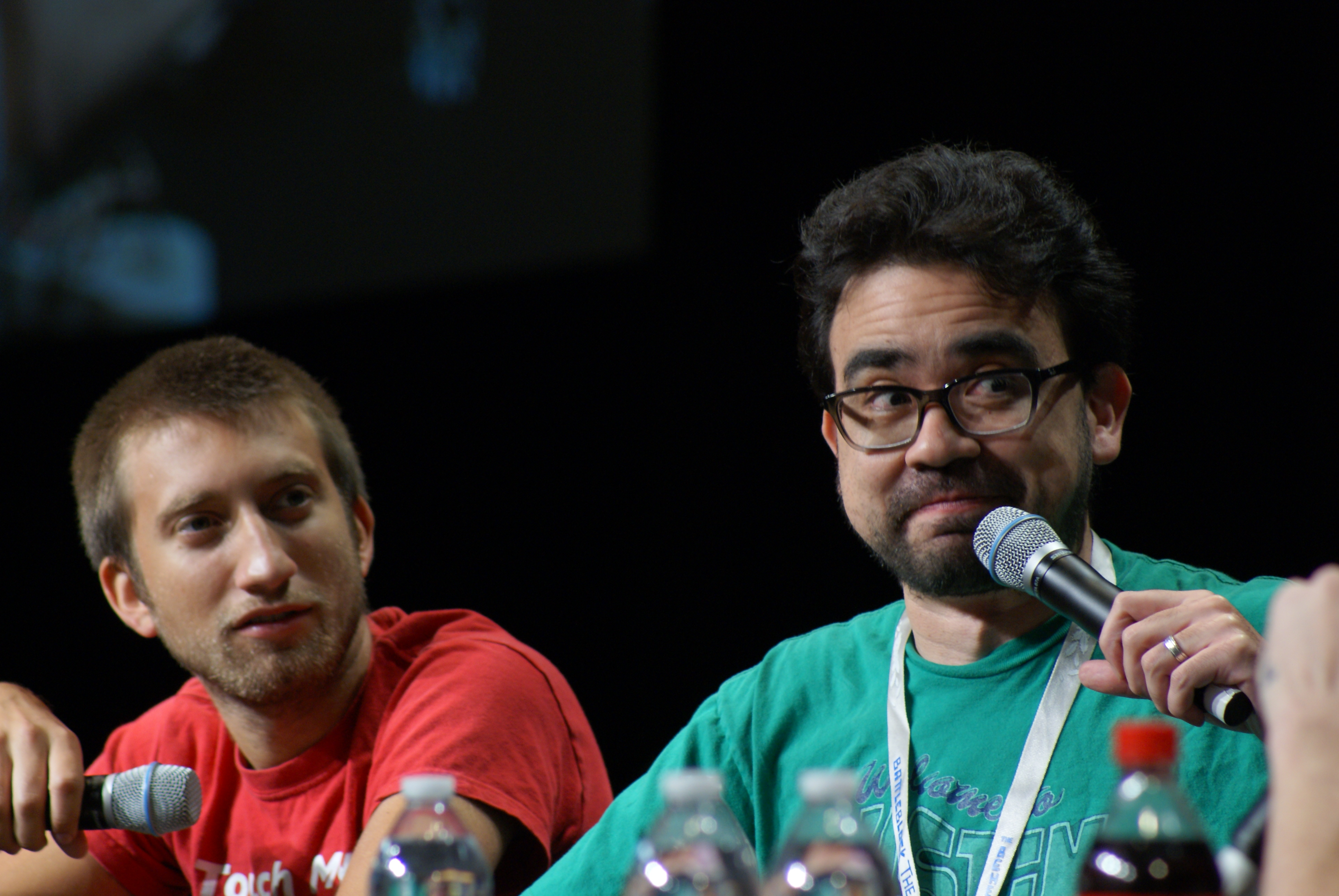
Gavin Free and Gus Sorola co-hosting a panel for the Rooster Teeth Podcast at RTX 2013

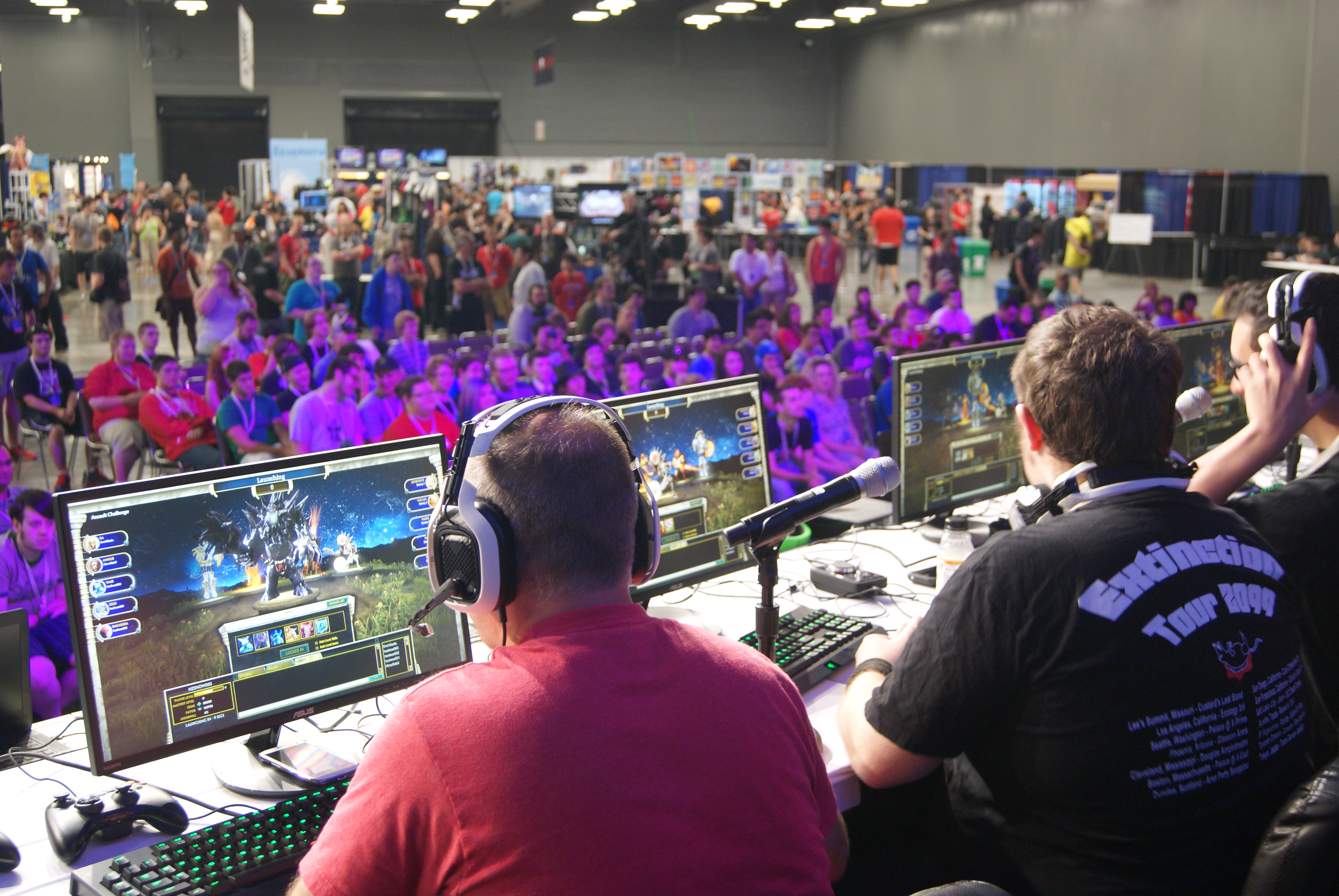
Competitive gaming in front of a crowd at RTX 2013

RTX 2013 was held from 5–7 July at the Austin Convention Center, once again with significant expansion with over 10,000 attendees. 343 Industries returned to run a Halo 4 tournament and have a panel in which they made announcements regarding Halo 4's future DLC. The Rooster Teeth series RWBY made its premiere and show creator Monty Oum made an appearance as a deliveryman from P.F. Changs during the panel. Ubisoft brought a publicly playable demo of Assassin's Creed IV: Black Flag. Attendees also had the opportunity to use the Oculus Rift virtual reality device, try out for Rooster Teeth's gaming competition series The Gauntlet, and take part in an episode of The Slow Mo Guys, as well as many other activities. The YouTube gaming group known as The Creatures also made an appearance, and made several important announcements involving their recent work, a new member to their group and the face reveal of Sp00n, who up until this point, had never revealed his face.

=== RTX 2014 ===
RTX 2014 was held from 4–6 July at the Austin Convention Center. Tickets went on sale on 31 January 2014. 343 Industries and Certain Affinity announced the addition of the Gungoose, a new version of the Mongoose, would be added to Halo 2: Anniversary. "Coagulation" was also announced as one of the six multiplayer maps to be re-imagined for Halo: The Master Chief Collection and will support the new Gungoose Capture The Flag game mode. The Creatures returned again, with another member added (Dexter Manning). During the Achievement Hunter panel Matt Bragg and Jeremy Dooley were hired; the latter would eventually become the sixth main member after Ray Narvaez, Jr. left in 2015.

=== RTX 2015 ===
RTX 2015 was held from 7–9 August at the Austin Convention Centre, the Hilton Austin Hotel and the JW Marriott. The pre-alpha of RWBY: Grimm Eclipse was available for demo. Rainbow Six Siege was playable and beta signups were guaranteed for attendees.

=== RTX 2016 ===
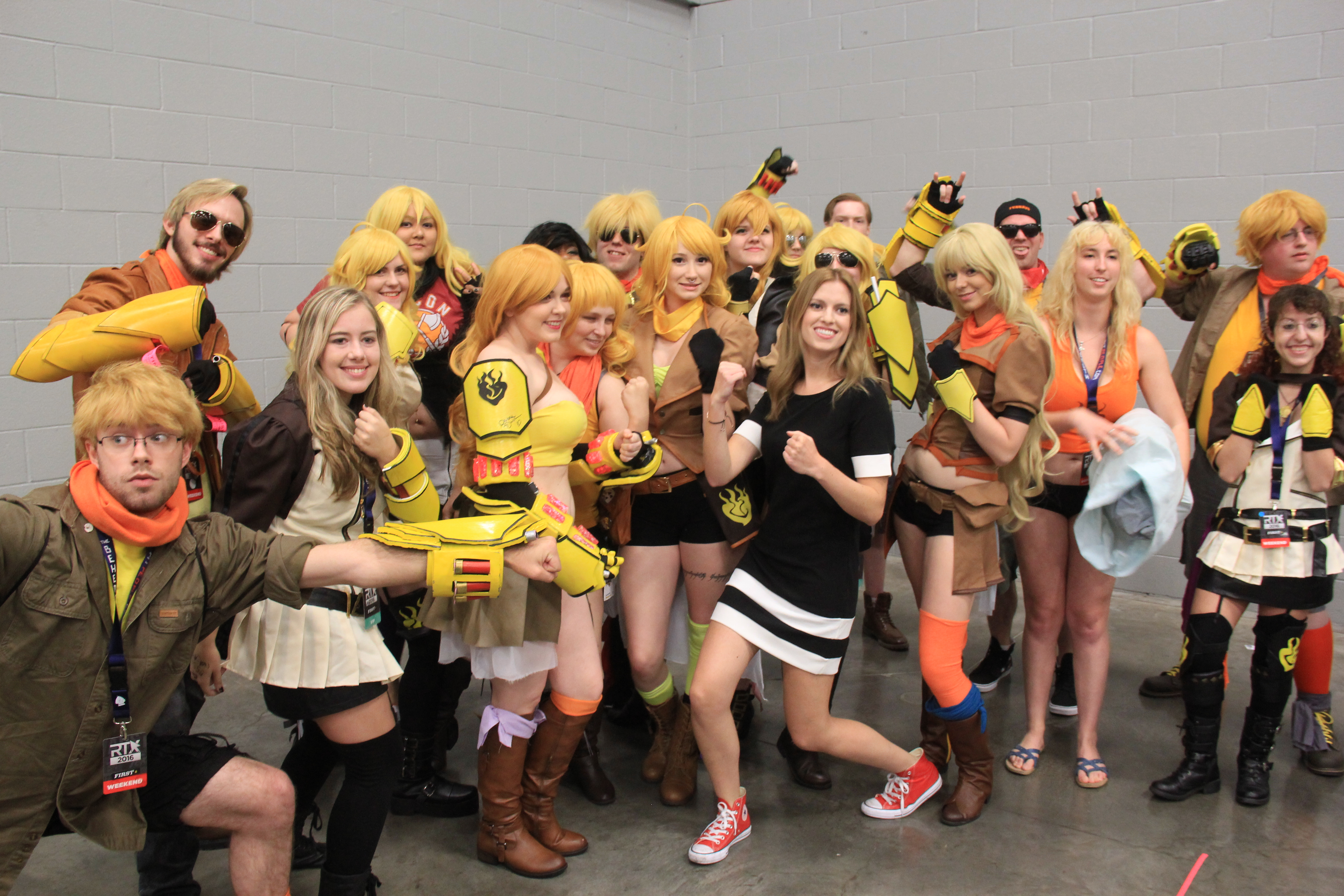
Cosplayers dressed as Yang Xiao Long from RWBY pose with Barbara Dunkelman, the character's voice actress, at RTX 2016.

RTX 2016 dates were announced on 12 November 2015, and was held from 1–3 July 2016. Like the year before, RTX 2016 was held at the Austin Convention Center, the Hilton Austin Hotel and the JW Marriott. It housed around 60,000 attendees.

=== RTX 2017 ===
RTX 2017 was held from 7–9 July and attracted 62,000 attendees. Its keynote was by Andy Serkis. The first two episodes of the Netflix anime series Castlevania had a special theatrical screening followed by Q&A with Director Sam Deats and executive producers Fred Seibert and Kevin Kolde. It featured concerts with Spazmatics and Phantogram, both hosted at Stubb's Waller Creek Amphitheater. It also featured an early screening of War for the Planet of the Apes at the Paramount Theater.

=== RTX 2018 ===
RTX 2018 was held August 3–5. Crypt TV premiered season 2 of The Look-See.

=== RTX 2019 ===
RTX 2019 was held from 5–7 July.

=== RTX at Home 2020 ===
Due to the COVID-19 pandemic, the 2020 event was initially rescheduled from 3–5 July to Labor Day Weekend, 5–7 September, before being canceled completely. Rooster Teeth has since scheduled an extended virtual event, dubbed “RTX at Home”, in its place, which was held from 15 to 25 September.

=== RTX at Home 2021 ===
Following from the previous convention, the 2021 event was once again entirely virtual, taking place from 8–17 July.

=== RTX 2022 ===
RTX 2022 was held from July 1–3, and was RTX's first in-person event since 2019.

=== RTX 2023 ===
RTX 2023 was held from July 7–9.

== RTX Sydney ==
RTX Sydney
- Status: Inactive
- Venue: Australian Technology Park (2016); International Convention Centre Sydney (2017–2018)
- Location: Sydney
- Country: Australia
- Years active: 3
- Inaugurated: January 23–24, 2016
- Most recent: February 3–4, 2018
- Attendance: ~11,000 (2016); ~20,000 (2017)
- Organizer: Rooster Teeth; Hanabee; Supanova
- Website: Official website

On 11 June 2015, Rooster Teeth announced RTX Australia, a collaboration with Hanabee and Supanova Pop Culture Expo. In 2017, the event was renamed RTX Sydney. In August 2018, Rooster Teeth announced they would replace RTX Sydney 2019 with three Let's Play Live events in different cities.

=== RTX Australia 2016 ===
The first RTX Australia was held at the Australian Technology Park in Sydney, from 23 to 24 January 2016 and attracted 11,000 attendees.

=== RTX Sydney 2017 ===
RTX Sydney 2017 was held from 4–5 February at the International Convention Centre Sydney in Darling Harbour, Sydney. On 19 June, the first guests were announced and included Rooster Teeth's Burnie Burns, Gus Sorola, Kerry Shawcross and Miles Luna, Achievement Hunter's Jack Pattillo and Kinda Funny's Greg Miller. In November 2016, Hideo Kojima was confirmed as a guest and attendance was anticipated at under 20,000. In December 2016, it was announced that the Nintendo Switch would be playable to demo for attendees at the convention.

=== RTX Sydney 2018 ===
RTX Sydney 2018, the third consecutive RTX convention to be held in Australia, took place from 3–4 February at the International Convention Centre Sydney. This was the first time members of The Yogscast were in attendance.

== RTX London ==
RTX London
- Status: Inactive
- Venue: ExCeL London
- Locations: London, England
- Country: United Kingdom
- Years active: 2
- Inaugurated: October 14–15, 2017
- Most recent: September 15–16, 2018
- Organizer: Rooster Teeth
- Website: Official website

Rooster Teeth announced RTX London on 3 February 2017, during RTX Sydney.

=== RTX London 2017 ===
RTX London 2017 was held on 14–15 October 2017, at ExCeL London.

=== RTX London 2018 ===
RTX London 2018 took place on 15–16 September at ExCeL London.
