= Wildflower Creek =

Stream in St. Louis County, Missouri, U.S.

Wildflower Creek is a stream in St. Louis County, Missouri in the U.S. state of Missouri. The 1.5-mile (2.4 km) long stream is a tributary to Deer Creek.

The stream headwaters arise at 38°38′06″N 90°25′30″W and the confluence with Deer Creek is at 38°38′31″N 90°24′04″W

Wildflower Creek was named for the wildflowers which abounded there.
