= Van Hoosear Wildflower Preserve =

Nature reserve in Sonoma County, California

Coordinates: 38°17′16″N 122°31′12″W

The Van Hoosear Wildflower Preserve is a private nature reserve on Carriger Creek in southern Sonoma County, California, United States. Van Hoosear was created to preserve an area known for displays of native wildflowers and to allow animal migration and ecological connection between Sonoma Mountain and the floor of the Sonoma Valley. This 163-acre (66 ha) preserve has been established with an endowment fund to allow perpetual management; access to the preserve is controlled by the Sonoma Ecology Center.
