= Ryanhood =

Independent folk rock band

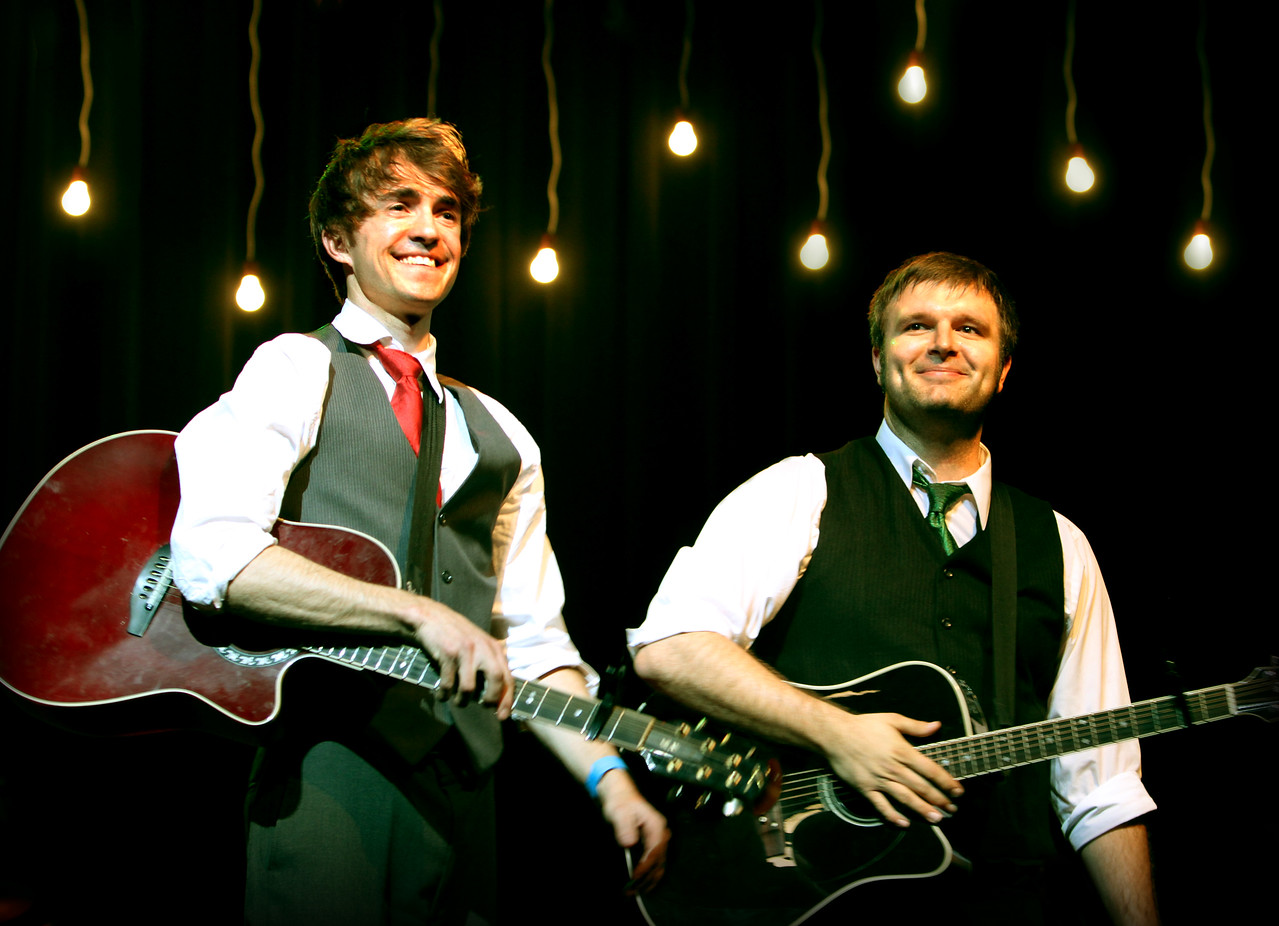
- Ryan Green (left) and Cameron Hood (right)

Background information
- Origin: Boston, Massachusetts, United States
- Genres: Folk rock, Indie folk, Indie rock, folk-pop
- Years active: 2003–present
- Members: Ryan Green; Cameron Hood
- Website: http://ryanhood.com/

Ryanhood is a two-man independent folk rock band formed in Boston, Massachusetts and currently based in Tucson, Arizona. They were established in 2003 by Cameron Hood and Ryan Green, the band's moniker itself being a portmanteau of its members' own names. Though they are primarily known for their acoustic blend of folk, rock, and pop influences, Ryanhood has also incorporated electric instrumentation on albums like After Night Came Sun and The World Awaits.

In the fifteen years since their inception, Ryanhood has gained national praise touring with the likes of renowned artists such as Jason Mraz, American Authors, Train, Lifehouse, Jay-Z and Kelly Clarkson. In 2009, the band generated further acclaim following Ellen DeGeneres tweeting about them. They have performed over 800 times throughout the United States and were named "Best Group/Duo" at the 2014 International Acoustic Music Awards (IAMAs).

As of 2018, the band has released six full-length studio albums and one live album. In 2013, Ryan Green debuted a solo album called Running In Circles under the stage name The Great Collision. It was released on Green and Hood's own imprint, Four Miles Music.

== History ==
Hood and Green first met in high school, where they considered each other friendly rivals fronting two separate rock bands. They would face off against each other for three respective years of their high school tenure, with Hood beating Green two out of three times in the high school's battle of the bands. Regardless of this rivalry, the two young musicians held a respect for one another that blossomed from out of Hood's admiring Green's skill behind the guitar.

Green's guitar proficiency eventually earned him a scholarship to the Berklee College of Music in Boston. Elsewhere, Hood remained in Tucson and became an art student at the University of Arizona. During this period of time, the two remained in close contact with one another despite the distance, mailing one another MiniDiscs with song ideas and converging in person over school breaks so that they could rehearse them. Following graduation, Hood joined Green in Boston and Ryanhood became full-time street performers at Quincy Market. They soon transferred to the college touring circuit, racking up acclaim and playing over 130 shows during this time.

Since their Boston-based beginnings, the duo has gone on to tour alongside a multitude of internationally renowned acts. Aside from those mentioned above, Ryanhood have also performed with the likes of NEEDTOBREATHE, Mat Kearney, Plain White T's, Howie Day, Ray Wylie Hubbard, and Carbon Leaf. They have also teamed up with Grammy Award-winning producer Ross Hogarth on the album The World Awaits.

Ryanhood has since relocated to their hometown of Tucson, Arizona. Following a few years of lying low, the band re-emerged with the release of 2014's Start Somewhere. The album was referred to by Zocalo as "powerfully genuine, and Ryanhood should be applauded for having the courage and sense of self to be so open-hearted in a hard, cruel world."

Most recently, Ryanhood released two full-length studio albums over the course of a single year with 2017's Yearbook and On Christmas. Yearbook is the band's first independently-tracked album, while On Christmas is an album full of mostly original holiday songs. Since their return to Tucson, the duo has become engaged in other collaborative projects based in the city. This includes Surrounding Dillinger, a contemporary dance production developed in collaboration with Artifact Dance Project that focuses on the life of Depression-era gangster John Dillinger.

As of 2018, Ryanhood is beginning to appeal to a broader worldwide audience. Besides tour dates strung throughout the United States over the next year, they will be making their live Australian debut at the National Folk Festival between 29 March and 2 April.

== Musical style and development ==
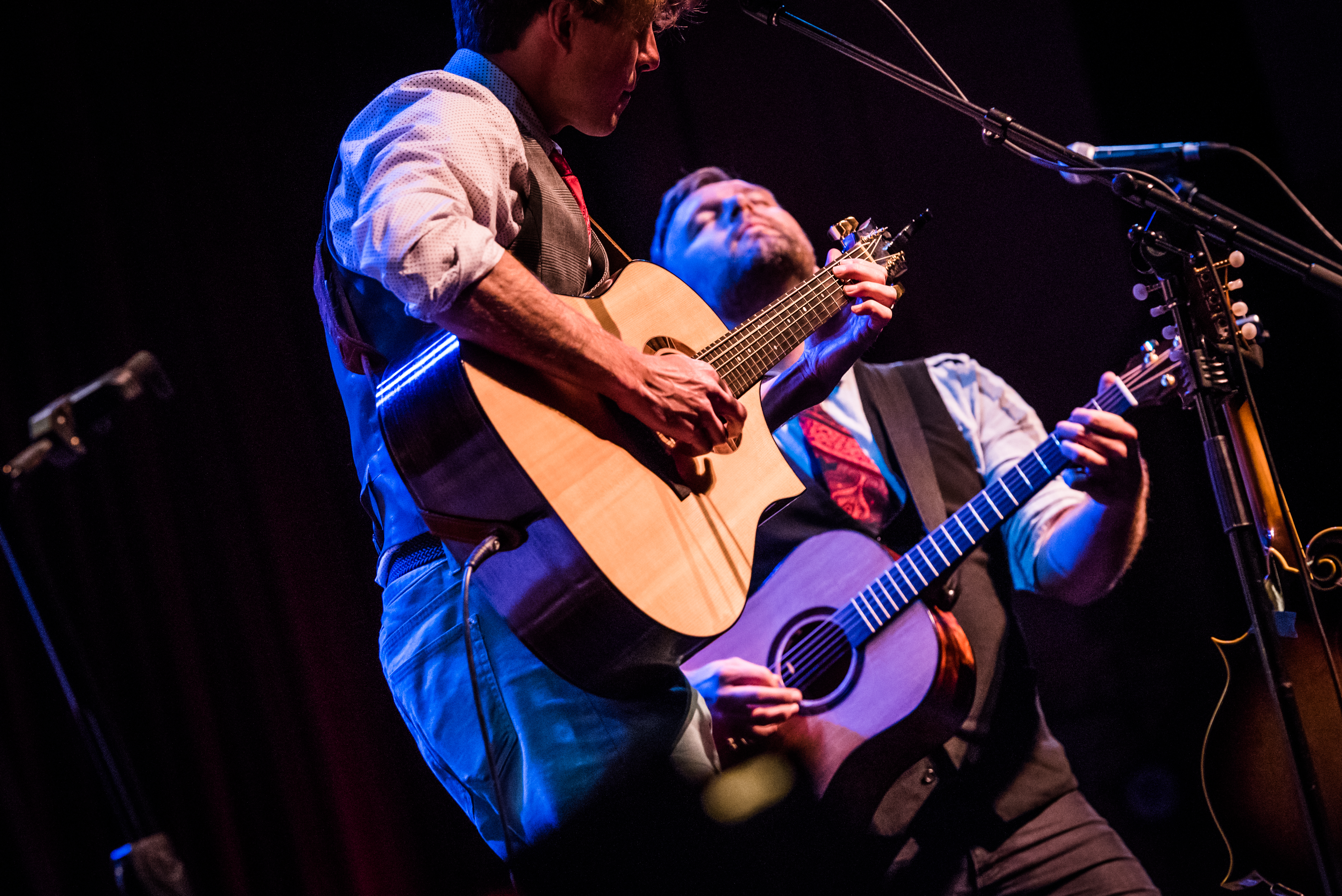
Ryanhood at Listening Room Festival 2016

Since their early years touring colleges, Ryanhood's musical stylings have been most often referred to as a blend of folk, rock, and pop influences. The band has gone on record concerning winning local awards for both "Best Folk Band" and "Best Rock Band", telling fans, "You can decide for yourself which is most accurate." Their music is primarily based around a mixture of acoustic instrumentation, vocal harmonies, and pop-centric hooks, having been called "a heartfelt slice of hook-heavy, folk-laced pop, complete with introspective musings and lush instrumentals," by The Daily Wildcat.

The Arizona Daily Star has gone on to call them "a match made in radio heaven" who are "armed with finger-flying acoustic-guitar solos, vocal harmonies and crowd-pleasing banter" that "easily won over the audience of more than 1,500" while opening for Jason Mraz. Their song "Sickbed Symphony" from Start Somewhere is an example of an acclaimed Ryanhood singalong, and was what won them the 2014 IAMA for "Best Group/Duo".

In a 2017 interview with Joey Frendo of For Folk's Sake, the band cited folk singer Livingston Taylor as an early mentor and influence. According to Hood, Taylor told them that, "Passion without discipline is yucky." From the beginning, his words have helped Ryanhood in realizing their vision of being a dynamic band without lacking any of the exactness typically associated with their acoustic designation.

== Influences ==
Cameron Hood is a fan of U2's Bono and has frequently cited him as an influence in interviews. In 2013, Hood told Zocalo that "I have a lot of room in my heart—an arena even—for Bono," going on to say that he is "moved at the way he takes the crowd to church." He's gone on record with For Folk's Sake saying that part of him "wants to go out into the crowd and be Bono," though he acknowledges that "who we actually are is two guys with two acoustic guitars who get on stage and get emotionally naked in front of people and hope they’ll follow suit."

Other influences of Hood's include Lindsey Buckingham, John Lennon and Paul McCartney. Green's influences include a bevy of adventuresome instrumental virtuosos throughout both folk and rock landscapes, such as Chris Thile, Béla Fleck, Julian Lage, and Joe Satriani. For this reason, in that same For Folk's Sake interview, Green said, "I’m always trying to push us to be left of center musically, and I think our partnership is good because without Cameron, I would probably be way out there."

== Members ==
- Cameron Hood - lead vocals, acoustic guitar, piano, percussion
- Ryan Green - lead vocals, mandolin, acoustic/electric guitar, bass, keys, percussion

== Discography ==
=== Studio albums ===
Title	Album details
Sad And Happiness	Release date: January 1, 2003; Label: Four Miles Music
Forward	Release date: January 1, 2004; Label: Four Miles Music
The World Awaits	Release date: April 4, 2009; Label: Four Miles Music
After Night Came Sun	Release Date: November 8, 2011; Label: Four Miles Music
Start Somewhere	Release Date: November 2, 2013; Label: Four Miles Music
Yearbook	Release Date: March 3, 2017; Label: Four Miles Music
On Christmas	Release Date: November 24, 2017; Label: Four Miles Music

=== Live albums ===
Title	Album details
The World Awaits Live in Tucson	Release Date: December 10, 2010; Label: Four Miles Music

== Awards and nominations ==
- 2009 Tucson Weekly magazine's TAMMIE Award for "Band of the Year"
- 2014 International Acoustic Music Award for "Best Group/Duo"
- 2017 WFUV "Discovery of the Year"
- 2018 Falcon Ridge Folk Festival "Most Wanted"
