= Funhaus =

Entertainment company (2015–2024)

- Funhaus logo used since 2016
- Type: Division
- Industry: Entertainment
- Genre: Comedy gaming, Let's Plays, Sketch Comedy
- Founded: February 12, 2015; 11 years ago
- Defunct: April 26, 2024
- Headquarters: Los Angeles, California, United States
- Key people: Bruce Greene; Elyse Willems; James Willems; Lawrence Sonntag; Adam Kovic; Matthew Peake
- Services: Online video Community website
- Parent: Rooster Teeth

Funhaus (pronounced fun-house) was an American comedy group, YouTube channel, and Los Angeles-based division of Rooster Teeth Productions. Composed primarily of former members of Machinima's Inside Gaming, the channel focuses on the production of comedy video content around video games, usually in the form of gameplays, streams, comedy sketches, and variety shows.

Funhaus was one of Rooster Teeth's most popular channels, with its main cast composed of Bruce Greene, Elyse Willems, James Willems, Lawrence Sonntag, Adam Kovic, and Matt Peake. The channel closed alongside Rooster Teeth in 2024. Funhaus's content focused mainly on improvisational, surreal, and vulgar humor, often centered around video games and adult-oriented themes and topics.

== History ==
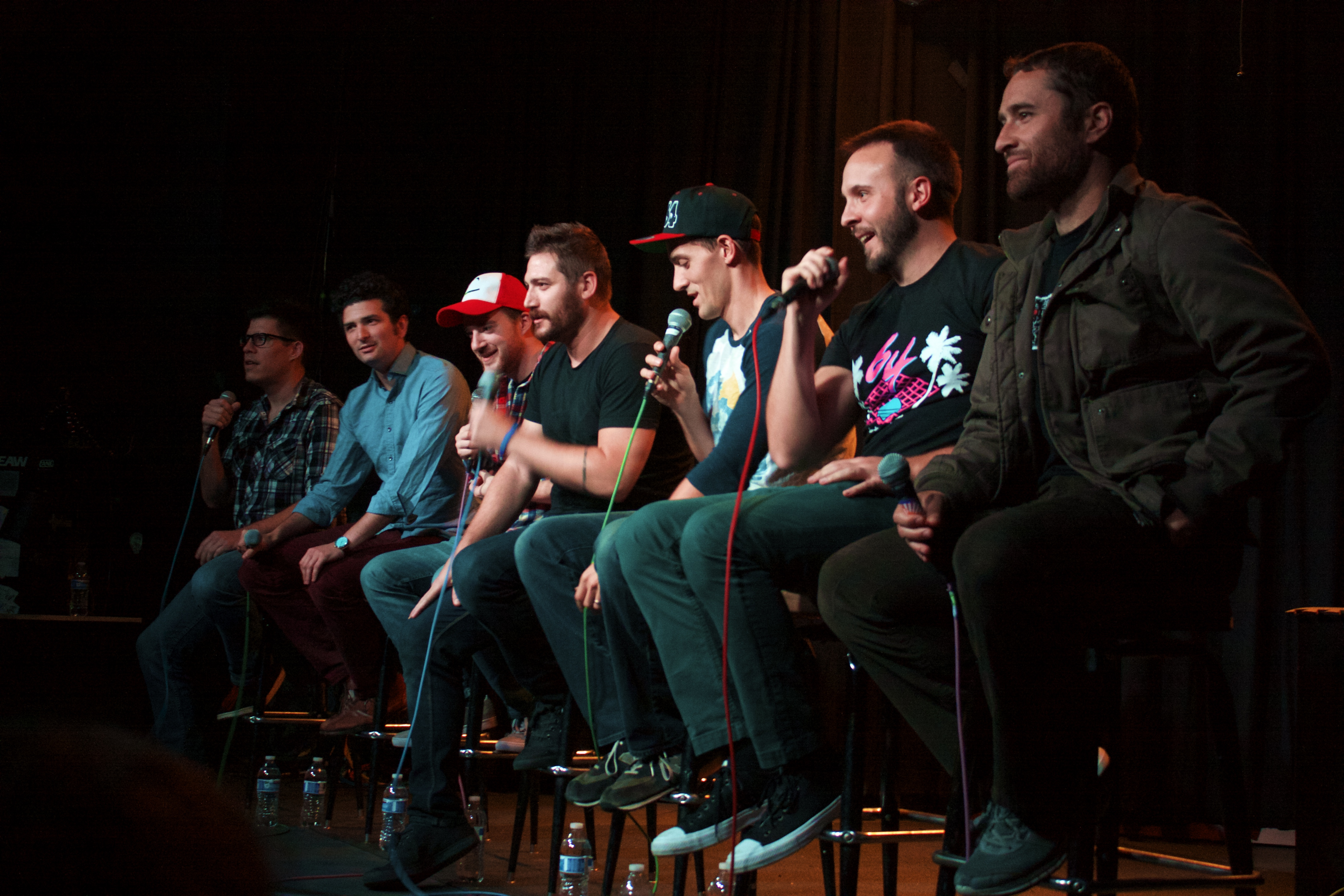
The original Funhaus cast at PAX 2015

Prior to joining Rooster Teeth, Kovic, Greene, Willems, Sonntag and Peake (along with Funhaus alumni Sean Poole and Joel Rubin) were part of Inside Gaming, a video game-based comedy section of Machinima. In November 2014, Rooster Teeth was acquired by Fullscreen Media, a move that RT CEO Matt Hullum said would give them the resources and tools to expand and compete against other producers. As part of this expansion, in February 2015, it was confirmed that Rooster Teeth would be establishing an office in Los Angeles, from which the newly created channel Funhaus would produce content. With this move Rooster Teeth also hired the Inside Gaming cast, which released the first teaser of the channel on February 5.

In November 2015, Funhaus confirmed the addition of Elyse Willems (James's wife and former collaborator in GameTrailers) to the main cast. The cast solidified into six core personalities (much like its sister channel, Achievement Hunter) with the departures of Joel Rubin and Sean Poole in 2016. New personalities such as Alanah Pearce were gradually added to the main cast as members began departing. Greene and Sonntag left in 2019, Kovic departed the company after breaching its code of conduct in October 2020, and Pearce announced her departure later that month. In March 2024, Rooster Teeth announced that it would be shutting down, and Funhaus ended along with it.

== Main shows ==
- Dude Soup: Funhaus's weekly podcast about video games featuring the main cast and occasional guests
- Open Haus: a weekly comedy Q&A show
- Filmhaus: a movie podcast
- Talking Stalkings: an extremely chaotic talk show hosted by James Willems featuring the screening of 90s television show Silk Stalkings, recurring guests such as Rahul Kohli, and a house band ("The OC Ska Kids").
- Demo Disk: the cast plays PC demo disks from the early 2000s and, in later years, incorporated gameplay using old Xbox 360 demo disks.
- Wheelhaus: a wheel of fortune is spun to decide which random Steam game will be played.
