= The Spazmatics =

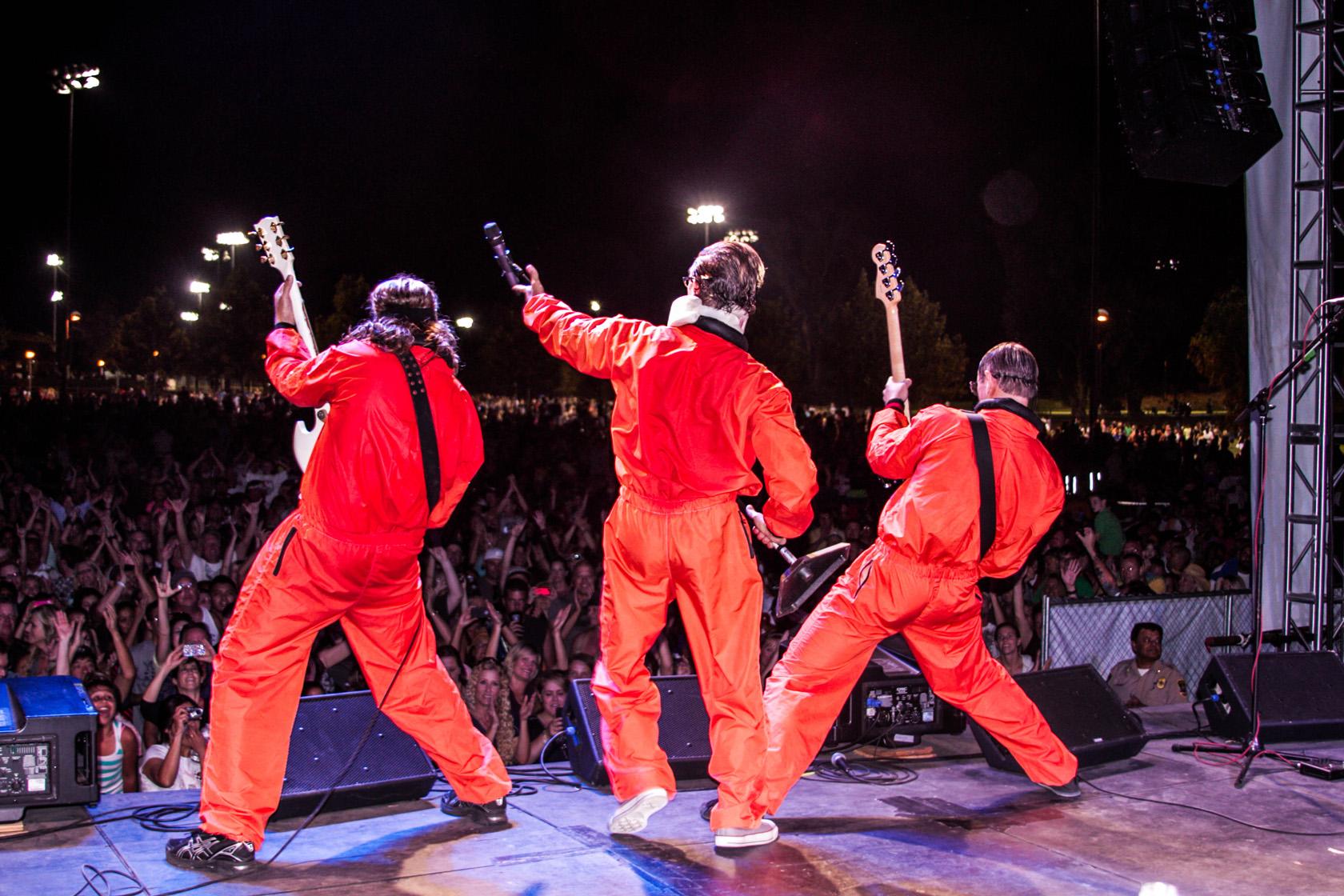

Background information
- Origin: Los Angeles, California
- Genres: 80's New Wave
- Years active: 2000 - present

The Spazmatics is a chain band, consisting of multiple cast members conceived by Perfect World Entertainment. The band plays cover songs from the 1980s. There are Spazmatics lineups based in Dallas, Austin, Cleveland, Los Angeles, Las Vegas, San Francisco, Nashville, Tampa, Salt Lake City, Chicago, North Carolina, South Carolina, San Antonio and New York City.

== History ==
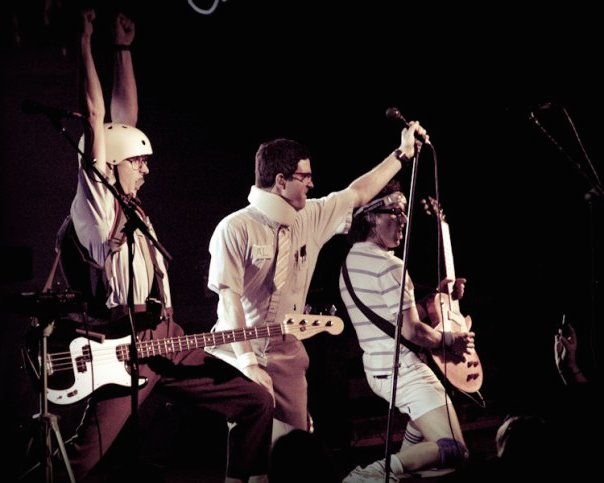
"tx spazmatics on stage"

In 1995, Jamie Brown, co-owner of Perfect World Entertainment, and his business partner Roger Sause established the Spazmatics. The band made its first appearance in Agoura Hills, California. By the end of the year, the Spazmatics performed in Chicago, Illinois, Las Vegas, Seattle, Washington and Tucson, Arizona. Perfect World Entertainment introduced the band to Los Angeles, California in 2000.

== Concept ==
The band members' onstage costume includes bowties, plaid pants, taped glasses, pocket protectors and short shorts. The costumes are a homage to the film Revenge of the Nerds. Perfect World Entertainment created a fictional biography for the Spazmatics as part of the band's gig.

=== The Spazmatics story ===
In 1983, the band was formed after Kevin Stigwood, a physics teacher at Alta Dena High in Thousand Oaks, California, lost a debate to a student. In result, Stigwood performed "She Blinded Me With Science" by Thomas Dolby at the state basketball championship game with the Spazmatics, a band he formed. Stigwood established the band with his brother, Curtis, Sidney Baderman and Rusty A. Woosmeir.
