= Operation Bayshield =

1997 short film

- Abdul Gouat Komsvallow in Operation Bayshield
- Engine: Quake engine
- Genre: Comedy
- Running time: 7 min.
- Voices: Tom "Paradox" Mustaine; Blenderhead; Lich
- Actor control: Faust; Lich; Monolithx
- Production company: Clan Undead
- Release(s): January 23, 1997
- Format: Quake demo recording

Operation Bayshield is a short 1997 film made by Clan Undead, a group of video game players. The work was created by using the machinima technique of recording a demonstration file of player actions in id Software's 1996 first-person shooter video game Quake, which could replay such files on demand. The group had seen the first known machinima productions, made by United Ranger Films, and decided to make a comedy film. The result, Operation Bayshield, follows a task force's attempts to thwart terrorists who have chemical explosives. Released on January 23, 1997, the work received praise from contemporary Quake movie review sites and helped to attract others, including Hugh Hancock of Strange Company and members of the ILL Clan, to machinima. It pioneered technical advances in machinima, such as the use of custom digital assets and of lip synchronization.

== Synopsis ==
Operation Bayshield centers on a task force's efforts to eliminate a group of terrorists. Offended by the television series Baywatch, the terrorists have stolen an "MMX chemical bomb" and are staying at an unknown room in a hotel in Vancouver, Washington. After the task force finds and stops the terrorists, a man named Big Jim confronts them as they leave, complaining that they "gassed [his] girlfriend". The film ends with the ensuing fight.

== Background and production ==
Clan Undead credits United Ranger Films with inspiring them to make their own film. According to clan member Tom "Paradox" Mustaine, working for Ritual Entertainment at the time, the idea arose during a New Year's Eve gathering. where the group decided to make a "larger comedy film in the Quake engine". According to Henry Lowood of Stanford University, this marked a shift toward narrative conventions of linear media, in contrast to earlier gameplay-based machinima works, such as Diary of a Camper and Quake done Quick. However, filming still required both the ability to program game modifications and to play proficiently. According to Lowood, Clan Undead probably recorded the raw footage "in a small number of continuous runs". Because there were no publicly available machinima software tools at the time, they handled the significant pre- and post-production work through custom scripts in QuakeC, an interpreted programming language developed for Quake.

Operation Bayshield was the first machinima work to incorporate custom digital assets. Clan Undead created graphical textures specifically for their characters and used custom visual effects, such as manipulating character images to produce first instance of lip synchronization in machinima. Although the effect was primitive, it was not used again in machinima for another year. This lip synchronization is an example of crude digital puppetry; other examples included the shaking of character bodies when laughing and synchronized delivery of dialogue. Lowood believes that Clan Undead pre-recorded individual lines of dialogue to WAV files, and then triggered playback through a command in QuakeC. In April 1997, Clan Undead distributed the source code for its Operation Bayshield scripts over the Internet; Lowood believes that this release extended the Quake community's culture of sharing game modifications.

== Reception and impact ==
The major Quake machinima review sites of the day rated Operation Bayshield highly. In a short review, Stephen Lum of The Cineplex gave the work a 9.5 out of 10 and called it "one of the best and funniest Quake Movies ever made"; he saw inconsistent camera manipulation as the only flaw. Rating the film 100% out of 100%, Roger Matthews of the Quake Movie Library pointed to humorous parts of the work in his synopsis, and thought that the last scene was nonsensical. Paul Coates of Psyk's Popcorn Jungle, who gave Operation Bayshield a 10 out of 10 rating and awarded it a Golden Popcorn award, considered the work "very polished" and the most technologically advanced Quake machinima film until Blahbalicious. He praised the humor, but said that repeated viewings weakened its effect. According to Paul Marino, executive director of the Academy of Machinima Arts & Sciences, Operation Bayshield received enough attention from the video gaming industry to help to advance Mustaine's career. id Software employee American McGee praised it in his .plan file.

Lowood called Diary of a Camper, Quake done Quick, and Operation Bayshield "the founding trilogy of machinima". For comparison to early film, he placed these works between the 1895 footage recorded by Auguste and Louis Lumière and the 1902 film A Trip to the Moon. Writing for the Houston Press, Robert Wilonsky stated that Operation Bayshield was "a freaky hybrid" of Quake's visuals and of sketch comedy resembling that of television show Saturday Night Live. Ben Moss of machinima.com contrasted the inside jokes in later Quake movies with Operation Bayshield's references to popular fiction, including the 1982 film E.T. the Extra-Terrestrial. In turn, the work's E.T. joke inspired similar mentions of extraterrestrials in Quake done Quick and other machinima films.

Operation Bayshield helped to attract other artists to use machinima. Inspired by the work, the ILL Clan, a group of Quake players who had recently graduated from college as film and animation majors, further developed comedy in machinima through their films Apartment Huntin' (1998) and Hardly Workin' (2000). Hugh Hancock of Strange Company partially credits Operation Bayshield for his realization that there were "possibilities for Quake Movies beyond a toy". Brian "Wendingo" Hess, co-creator of Blahbalicious, began work on his film after watching a group of machinima films that included Operation Bayshield. In interviews with Machinima.com, others have stated that the work influenced them.
