= Machinima =

Film production in graphics engines

Machinima filmed in Second Life

Machinima (/məˈʃiːnɪmə, -ˈʃɪn-/) is an animation technique using real-time screen capturing in computer graphics engines, video games and virtual worlds to create a cinematic production. The term machinima is a portmanteau of the words machine and cinema. According to Guinness World Records, machinima is an art of making animated narrative films from computer graphics, most commonly used by video games.

Machinima-based artists, sometimes called machinimists or machinimators, are often fan laborers, by virtue of their reuse of copyrighted materials (see below). Machinima offers to provide an archive of gaming performance and access to the look and feel of software and hardware that may already have become obsolete or even unavailable. For game studies, "Machinima's gestures grant access to gaming's historical conditions of possibility and how machinima offers links to a comparative horizon that informs, changes, and fully participates in videogame culture."

The practice of using graphics engines from video games arose from the animated software introductions of the 1980s demoscene, Disney Interactive Studios' 1992 video game Stunt Island, and 1990s recordings of gameplay in first-person shooter (FPS) video games, such as id Software's Doom and Quake. Originally, these recordings documented speed runs—attempts to complete a level as quickly as possible—and multiplayer matches. The addition of storylines to these films created "Quake movies". The more general term machinima, a blend of machine and cinema, arose when the concept spread beyond the Quake series to other games and software. After this generalization, machinima appeared in mainstream media, including television series and advertisements.

Machinima has advantages and disadvantages when compared to other styles of filmmaking. Its relative simplicity over traditional frame-based animation limits control and range of expression. Its real-time nature favors speed, cost saving, and flexibility over the higher quality of pre-rendered computer animation. Virtual acting is less expensive, dangerous, and physically restricted than live action. Machinima can be filmed by relying on in-game artificial intelligence (AI) or by controlling characters and cameras through digital puppetry. Scenes can be precisely scripted, and can be manipulated during post-production using video editing techniques. Editing, custom software, and creative cinematography may address technical limitations. Game companies have provided software for and have encouraged machinima, but the widespread use of digital assets from copyrighted games has resulted in complex, unresolved legal issues.

Machinima productions can remain close to their gaming roots and feature stunts or other portrayals of gameplay. Popular genres include dance videos, comedy, and drama. Alternatively, some filmmakers attempt to stretch the boundaries of the rendering engines or to mask the original 3D context. The Academy of Machinima Arts & Sciences (AMAS), a non-profit organization dedicated to promoting machinima, recognizes exemplary productions through Mackie awards given at its annual Machinima Film Festival. Some general film festivals accept machinima, and game companies, such as Epic Games, Valve, Blizzard Entertainment and Jagex, have sponsored contests involving it.

== History ==
=== Precedent ===
1980s software crackers added custom introductory credits sequences (intros) to programs whose copy protection they had removed. Increasing computing power allowed for more complex intros, and the demoscene formed when focus shifted to the intros instead of the cracks. The goal became to create the best 3D demos in real-time with the least amount of software code. Disk storage was too slow for this, so graphics had to be calculated on the fly and without a pre-existing game engine.

In Disney Interactive Studios' 1992 computer game Stunt Island, users could stage, record, and play back stunts. As Nitsche stated, the game's goal was "not ... a high score but a spectacle." Released the following year, id Software's Doom included the ability to record gameplay as sequences of events that the game engine could later replay in real-time. Because events and not video frames were saved, the resulting game demo files were small and easily shared among players. A culture of recording gameplay developed, as Henry Lowood of Stanford University said, "a context for spectatorship.... The result was nothing less than a metamorphosis of the player into a performer." Another important feature of Doom was that it allowed players to create their own modifications, maps, and software for the game, thus expanding the concept of game authorship. In machinima, there is a dual register of gestures: the trained motions of the player determine the in-game images of expressive motion.

In parallel with the video game approach, in the media art field, Maurice Benayoun's Virtual Reality artwork The Tunnel under the Atlantic (1995), often compared to video games, introduced a virtual film director, fully autonomous intelligent agent, to shoot and edit in real time a full video from the digging performance in the Pompidou Center in Paris and the Museum of Contemporary art in Montreal. The full movie, Inside the Tunnel under the Atlantic, 21h long, was followed in 1997 by Inside the Paris New-Delhi Tunnel (13h long). Only short excerpts were presented to the public. The complex behavior of the Tunnel's virtual director makes it a significant precursor of later application to video games based machinimas.

Doom's 1996 successor, Quake, offered new opportunities for both gameplay and customization, while retaining the ability to record demos. Multiplayer video games became popular, and demos of matches between teams of players (clans) were recorded and studied. Paul Marino, executive director of the AMAS, stated that deathmatches, a type of multiplayer game, became more "cinematic". At this point, however, they still documented gameplay without a narrative.

=== Quake movies ===
On October 26, 1996, a well-known gaming clan, the Rangers, surprised the Quake community with Diary of a Camper, the first widely known machinima film. This short, 100-second demo file contained the action and gore of many others, but in the context of a brief story, rather than the usual deathmatch. An example of transformative or emergent gameplay, this shift from competition to theater required both expertise in and subversion of the game's mechanics. The Ranger demo emphasized this transformation by retaining specific gameplay references in its story.

Diary of a Camper inspired many other "Quake movies," as these films were then called. A community of game modifiers (modders), artists, expert players, and film fans began to form around them. The works were distributed and reviewed on websites such as The Cineplex, Psyk's Popcorn Jungle, and the Quake Movie Library (QML). Production was supported by dedicated demo-processing software, such as Uwe Girlich's Little Movie Processing Center (LMPC) and David "crt" Wright's non-linear editor Keygrip, which later became known as "Adobe Premiere for Quake demo files". Among the notable films were Clan Phantasm's Devil's Covenant, the first feature-length Quake movie; Avatar and Wendigo's Blahbalicious, which the QML awarded seven Quake Movie Oscars; and Clan Undead's Operation Bayshield, which introduced simulated lip synchronization and featured customized digital assets.

Released in December 1997, id Software's Quake II improved support for user-created 3D models. However, without compatible editing software, filmmakers continued to create works based on the original Quake. These included the ILL Clan's Apartment Huntin' and the Quake done Quick group's Scourge Done Slick. Quake II demo editors became available in 1998. In particular, Keygrip 2.0 introduced "recamming", the ability to adjust camera locations after recording. Paul Marino called the addition of this feature "a defining moment for [m]achinima". With Quake II filming now feasible, Strange Company's 1999 production Eschaton: Nightfall was the first work to feature entirely custom-made character models.

Borg War, a 90-minute animated Star Trek fan film, was produced using Elite Force 2 (a Quake III variant) and Starfleet Command 3, repurposing the games' voiceover clips to create a new plot. Borg War was nominated for two "Mackie" awards by the Academy of Machinima Arts & Sciences. An August 2007 screening at a Star Trek convention in Las Vegas was the first time that CBS/Paramount had approved the screening of a non-parody fan film at a licensed convention.

=== Generalization ===
In January 2000, Hugh Hancock, the founder of Strange Company, launched a new website, machinima.com. Coined by Anthony Bailey in a May 1998 email to Hancock, the term is a misspelled portmanteau of machine cinema (machinema) which was intended to dissociate in-game filming from a specific engine. The new site featured tutorials, interviews, articles, and the exclusive release of Tritin Films' Quad God. The first film made with Quake III Arena, Quad God was also the first to be distributed as recorded video frames, not game-specific instructions. This change was initially controversial among machinima producers who preferred the smaller size of demo files. However, demo files required a copy of the game to view. The more accessible traditional video format broadened Quad God's viewership, and the work was distributed on CDs bundled with magazines. Thus, id's decision to protect Quake III's code inadvertently caused machinima creators to use more general solutions and thus widen their audience. Within a few years, machinima films were almost exclusively distributed in common video file formats.

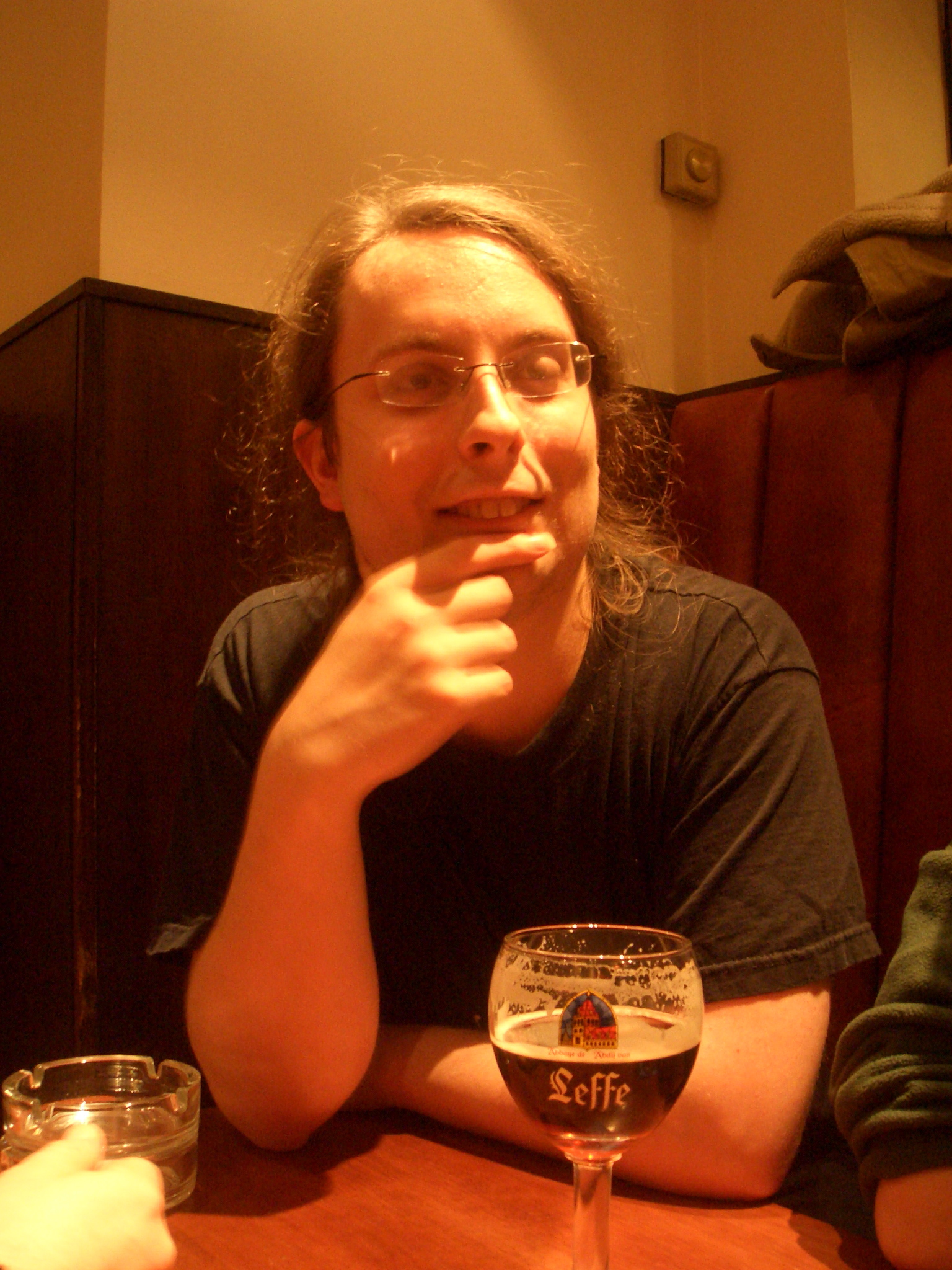
Hugh Hancock founded Strange Company.

Machinima began to receive mainstream notice. Roger Ebert discussed it in a June 2000 article and praised Strange Company's machinima setting of Percy Bysshe Shelley's sonnet "Ozymandias". At Showtime Network's 2001 Alternative Media Festival, the ILL Clan's 2000 machinima film Hardly Workin' won the Best Experimental and Best in SHO awards. Steven Spielberg used Unreal Tournament to test special effects while working on his 2001 film Artificial Intelligence: A.I. Eventually, interest spread to game developers. In July 2001, Epic Games announced that its upcoming game Unreal Tournament 2003 would include Matinee, a machinima production software utility. As involvement increased, filmmakers released fewer new productions to focus on quality.

At the March 2002 Game Developers Conference, five machinima makers—Anthony Bailey, Hugh Hancock, Katherine Anna Kang, Paul Marino, and Matthew Ross—founded the AMAS, a non-profit organization dedicated to promoting machinima. At QuakeCon in August, the new organization held the first Machinima Film Festival, which received mainstream media coverage. Anachronox: The Movie, by Jake Hughes and Tom Hall, won three awards, including Best Picture. The next year, "In the Waiting Line", produced by Ghost Robot, directed by Tommy Pallotta and animated by Randy Cole, utilizing Fountainhead Entertainment's Machinimation tools, it became the first machinima music video to air on MTV. As graphics technology improved, machinima filmmakers used other video games and consumer-grade video editing software. Using Bungie's 2001 game Halo: Combat Evolved, Rooster Teeth Productions created a popular comedy series Red vs. Blue: The Blood Gulch Chronicles. The series' second season premiered at the Lincoln Center for the Performing Arts in 2004.

=== Recent history ===
Super Mario Clouds from 2002 is a multi-channel video installation by Cory Arcangel in which he modifies the 1985 Nintendo game Super Mario Bros., removing all game assets except the blue sky and white pixelated clouds. The work eliminates visual elements such as characters, platforms, and background objects, leaving only the slowly scrolling clouds across a blue background.

In January 2019, Machinima, Inc., which had shifted its focus away from machinima-based content into general video game-related fare in its later years, abruptly discontinued their YouTube channels, with all their videos set to private. This came shortly after then-parent company Warner Bros. (via its owner, Time Warner) was acquired by AT&T; leading to the subsequent formation of WarnerMedia. On February 1, 2019, Machinima officially announced that it had laid off its 81 employees and ceased remaining operations. The company stated that certain employees were being retained to work for AT&T's Otter Media holding company, and that Russell Arons was "assisting with transitional activities as she explores new opportunities". The closure resulted in 81 layoffs from the company.

An opinion piece from Wired UK blamed the company's collapse on an "obvious misunderstanding of what Machinima actually was, or what traditional media companies were even buying when they purchased a [content network]", with the possibility of future machinima distribution networks of that size emerging being slim.

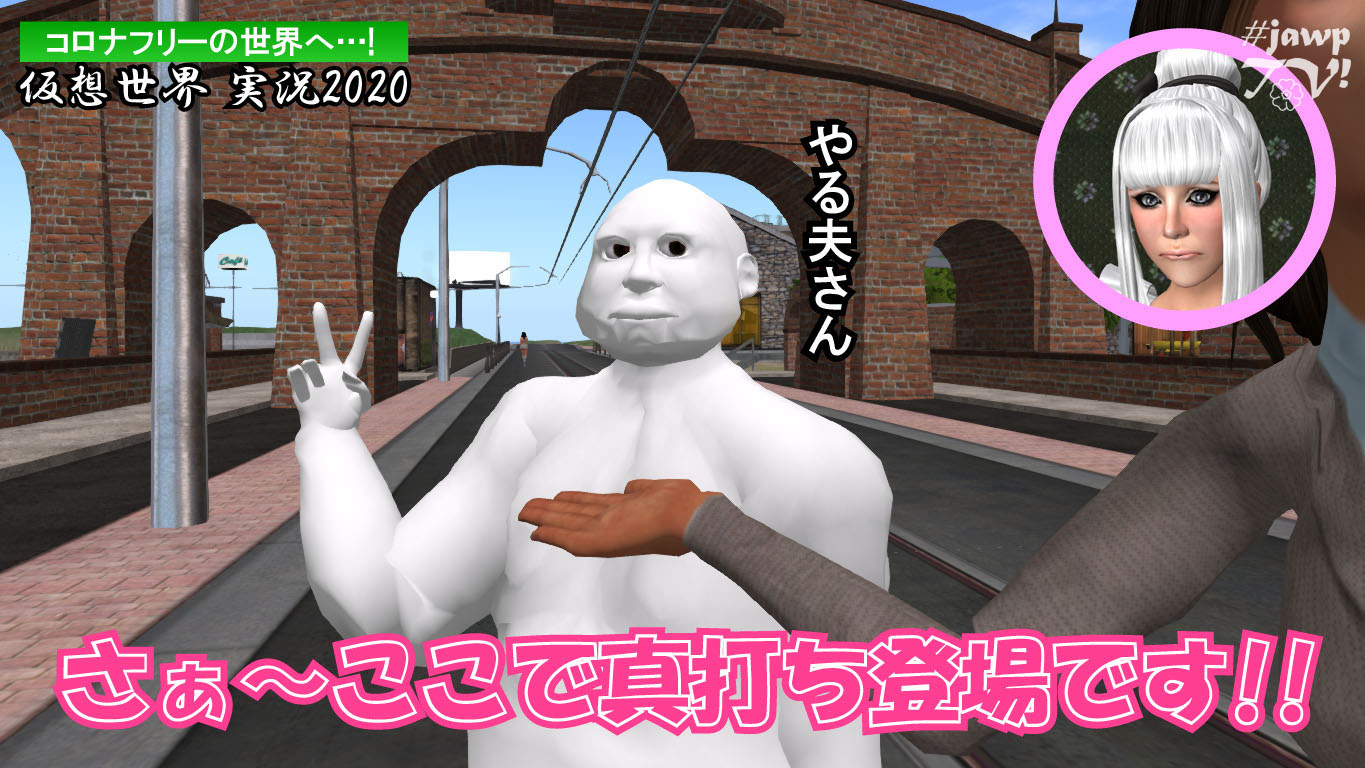
Machinima in Japan

On March 6, 2024, Rooster Teeth general manager Jordan Levin notified employees that the company would close over the next several months. In an email, he cited reasons for the shutdown including "fundamental shifts in consumer behavior and monetization across platforms, advertising, and patronage", with it being reported that the number of subscribers to Rooster Teeth's "First" service had dropped to around one-quarter of their peak and that Rooster Teeth as a whole had been unprofitable for a decade. Then-parent Warner Bros. Discovery (formed from the sale of WarnerMedia from AT&T into a Reverse Morris Trust merger with Discovery, Inc. in 2021.) would gauge interest in Red vs. Blue, and the studio's other intellectual property (including RWBY, and Gen:Lock).

Within the timeframe between Machinima Inc., and Rooster Teeth's respective closures, Australian animator Luke Lerdwichagul would gain prominence from his Super Mario 64 and Garry's Mod-based sketch comedy series, SMG4. He would eventually form the independent animation studio Glitch Productions with his brother, Kevin, while continuing to work on the series until December 2025.

Sara Sadik is a French digital artist known for her use of machinima to explore themes of masculinity, identity, and the experiences of young men in the Maghrebi diaspora. Utilizing video game engines like Grand Theft Auto V, her works blend fictional and documentary elements to create narratives that highlight underrepresented voices.

In recent years, Minecraft machinima, referring to films created within the virtual environment of the video game Minecraft, has attracted increasing attention in contemporary art and film discourse. It is notable for its do-it-yourself ethos and a potential to challenge conventional ideas of authorship, cinematic form, and game-based narrative. Due to its accessibility and creative flexibility, Minecraft has become a widely adopted platform among young filmmakers, educators, and artists.

== Production ==
=== Comparison to film techniques ===
The AMAS defines machinima as "animated filmmaking within a real-time virtual 3-D environment". In other 3D animation methods, creators can control every frame and nuance of their characters but, in turn, must consider issues such as key frames and inbetweening. Machinima creators leave many rendering details to their host environments, but may thus inherit those environments' limitations. Second Life Machinima film maker Ozymandius King provided a detailed account of the process by which the artists at MAGE Magazine produce their videos. "Organizing for a photo shoot is similar to organizing for a film production. Once you find the actors / models, you have to scout locations, find clothes and props for the models and type up a shooting script. The more organized you are the less time it takes to shoot the scene." Because game animations focus on dramatic rather than casual actions, the range of character emotions is often limited. However, Kelland, Morris, and Lloyd state that a small range of emotions is often sufficient, as in successful Japanese anime television series.

Another difference is that machinima is created in real time, but other animation is pre-rendered. Real-time engines need to trade quality for speed and use simpler algorithms and models. In the 2001 animated film Final Fantasy: The Spirits Within, every strand of hair on a character's head was independent; real-time needs would likely force them to be treated as a single unit. Kelland, Morris, and Lloyd argue that improvement in consumer-grade graphics technology will allow more realism. Similarly, Paul Marino connects machinima to the increasing computing power predicted by Moore's law. For cut scenes in video games, issues other than visual fidelity arise. Pre-rendered scenes can require more digital storage space, weaken suspension of disbelief through contrast with real-time animation of normal gameplay, and limit interaction.

Like live action, machinima is recorded in real-time, and real people can act and control the camera. Filmmakers are often encouraged to follow traditional cinematic conventions, such as avoiding wide fields of view, the overuse of slow motion, and errors in visual continuity. Unlike live action, machinima involves less expensive, digital special effects and sets, possibly with a science-fiction or historical theme. Explosions and stunts can be tried and repeated without monetary cost and risk of injury, and the host environment may allow unrealistic physical constraints. University of Cambridge experiments in 2002 and 2003 attempted to use machinima to re-create a scene from the 1942 live-action film Casablanca. Machinima filming differed from traditional cinematography in that character expression was limited, but camera movements were more flexible and improvised. Nitsche compared this experiment to an unpredictable Dogme 95 production.

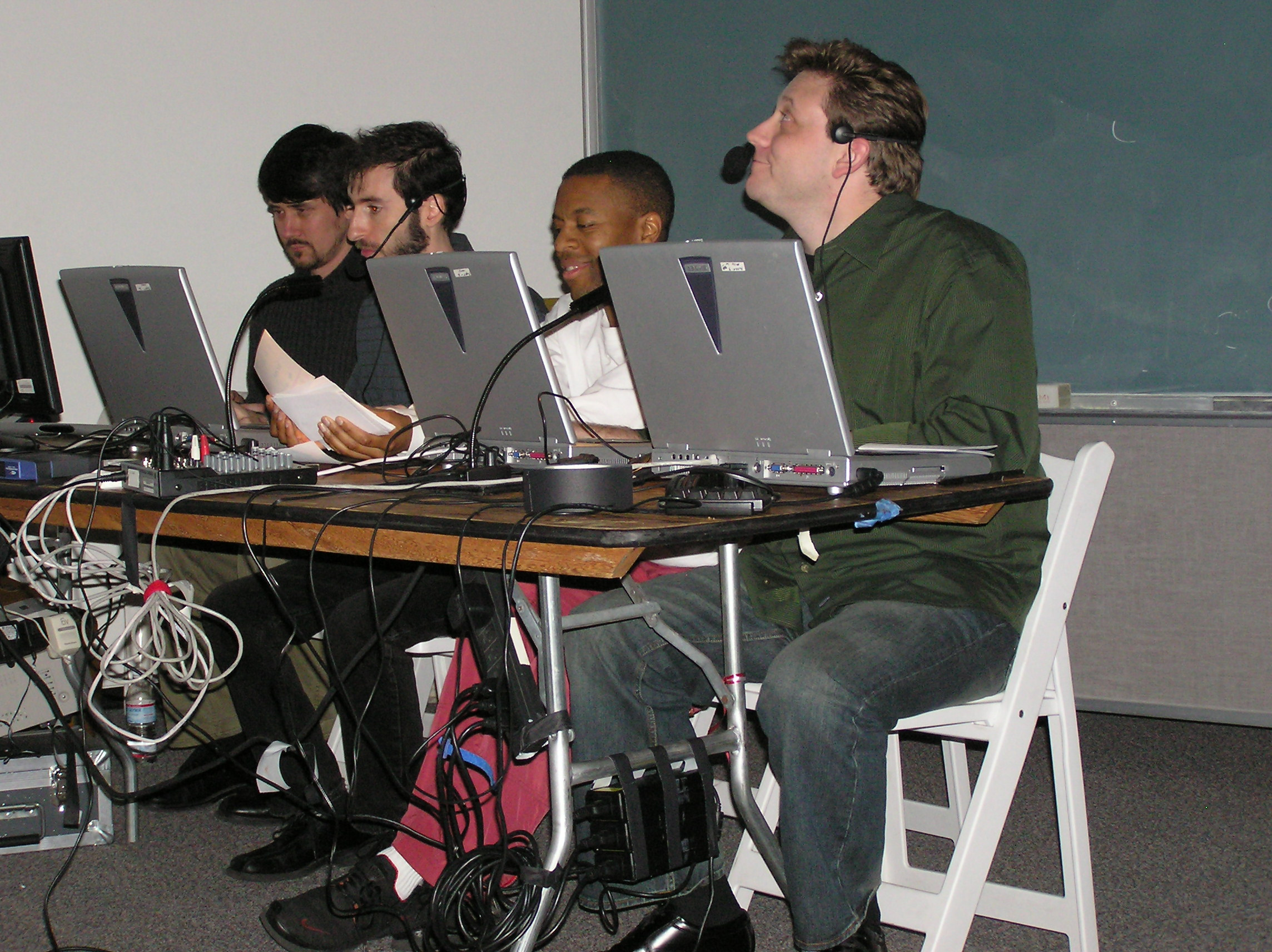
The ILL Clan performs its machinima comedy talk show Tra5hTa1k with ILL Will in front of a live audience at Stanford University in 2005. Left to Right: Frank Dellario, Matt Dominianni, Manu Smith, Paul Jannicola.

Berkeley sees machinima as "a strangely hybrid form, looking forwards and backwards, cutting edge and conservative at the same time". Machinima is a digital medium based on 3D computer games, but most works have a linear narrative structure. Some, such as Red vs. Blue and The Strangerhood, follow narrative conventions of television situational comedy. Nitsche agrees that pre-recorded ("reel") machinima tends to be linear and offers limited interactive storytelling while machinima has more opportunities performed live and with audience interaction. In creating their improvisational comedy series On the Campaign Trail with Larry & Lenny Lumberjack and talk show Tra5hTa1k with ILL Will, the ILL Clan blended real and virtual performance by creating the works on-stage and interacting with a live audience. In another combination of real and virtual worlds, Chris Burke's talk show This Spartan Life takes place in Halo 2's open multiplayer environment. There, others playing in earnest may attack the host or his interviewee. Although other virtual theatrical performances have taken place in chat rooms and multi-user dungeons, machinima adds "cinematic camera work". Previously, such virtual cinematic performances with live audience interaction were confined to research labs equipped with powerful computers.

Machinima can be less expensive than other forms of filmmaking. Strange Company produced its feature-length machinima film BloodSpell for less than £10,000. Before using machinima, Burnie Burns and Matt Hullum of Rooster Teeth Productions spent US$9,000 to produce a live-action independent film. In contrast, the four Xbox game consoles used to make Red vs. Blue in 2005 cost $600. The low cost caused a product manager for Electronic Arts to compare machinima to the low-budget independent film The Blair Witch Project, without the need for cameras and actors. Because these are seen as low barriers to entry, machinima has been called a "democratization of filmmaking". Berkeley weighs increased participation and a blurred line between producer and consumer against concerns that game copyrights limit commercialization and growth of machinima.

Comparatively, machinimists using pre-made virtual platforms like Second Life have indicated that their productions can be made quite successfully with no cost at all. Creators like Dutch director Chantal Harvey, producer of the 48 Hour Film Project Machinima sector, have created upwards of 200 films using the platform. Harvey's advocacy of the genre has resulted in the involvement of film director Peter Greenaway who served as a juror for the Machinima category and gave a keynote speech during the event.

=== Character and camera control ===
Kelland, Morris, and Lloyd list four main methods of creating machinima. From simple to advanced, these are: relying on the game's AI to control most actions, digital puppetry, recamming, and precise scripting of actions. Although simple to produce, AI-dependent results are unpredictable, thus complicating the realization of a preconceived film script. For example, when Rooster Teeth produced The Strangerhood using The Sims 2, a game that encourages the use of its AI, the group had to create multiple instances of each character to accommodate different moods. Individual instances were selected at different times to produce appropriate actions.

In digital puppetry, machinima creators become virtual actors. Each crew member controls a character in real-time, as in a multiplayer game. The director can use built-in camera controls, if available. Otherwise, video is captured from the perspectives of one or more puppeteers who serve as camera operators. Puppetry allows for improvisation and offers controls familiar to gamers, but requires more personnel than the other methods and is less precise than scripted recordings. However, some games, such as the Halo series, (except for Halo PC and Custom Edition, which allow AI and custom objects and characters), allow filming only through puppetry. According to Marino, other disadvantages are the possibility of disruption when filming in an open multi-user environment and the temptation for puppeteers to play the game in earnest, littering the set with blood and dead bodies. However, Chris Burke intentionally hosts This Spartan Life in these unpredictable conditions, which are fundamental to the show. Other works filmed using puppetry are the ILL Clan's improvisational comedy series On the Campaign Trail with Larry & Lenny Lumberjack and Rooster Teeth Productions' Red vs. Blue. In recamming, which builds on puppetry, actions are first recorded to a game engine's demo file format, not directly as video frames. Without re-enacting scenes, artists can then manipulate the demo files to add cameras, tweak timing and lighting, and change the surroundings. This technique is limited to the few engines and software tools that support it.

A technique common in cutscenes of video games, scripting consists of giving precise directions to the game engine. A filmmaker can work alone this way, as J. Thaddeus "Mindcrime" Skubis did in creating the nearly four-hour The Seal of Nehahra (2000), the longest work of machinima at the time. However, perfecting scripts can be time-consuming. Unless what-you-see-is-what-you-get (WYSIWYG) editing is available, as in Vampire: The Masquerade – Redemption, changes may need to be verified in additional runs, and non-linear editing may be difficult. In this respect, Kelland, Morris, and Lloyd compare scripting to stop-motion animation. Another disadvantage is that, depending on the game, scripting capabilities may be limited or unavailable. Matinee, a machinima software tool included with Unreal Tournament 2004, popularized scripting in machinima.

=== Limitations and solutions ===
When Diary of a Camper was created, no software tools existed to edit demo files into films. Rangers clan member Eric "ArchV" Fowler wrote his own programs to reposition the camera and to splice footage from the Quake demo file. Quake movie editing software later appeared, but the use of conventional non-linear video editing software is now common. For example, Phil South inserted single, completely white frames into his work No Licence to enhance the visual impact of explosions. In the post-production of Red vs. Blue: The Blood Gulch Chronicles, Rooster Teeth Productions added letterboxing with Adobe Premiere Pro to hide the camera player's heads-up display.

Machinima creators have used different methods to handle limited character expression. The most typical ways that amateur-style machinima gets around limitations of expression include taking advantage of speech bubbles seen above players' heads when speaking, relying on the visual matching between a character's voice and appearance, and finding methods available within the game itself. Garry's Mod and Source Filmmaker include the ability to manipulate characters and objects in real-time, though the former relies on community addons to take advantage of certain engine features, and the latter renders scenes using non-real-time effects. In the Halo video game series, helmets completely cover the characters' faces. To prevent confusion, Rooster Teeth's characters move slightly when speaking, a convention shared with anime. Some machinima creators use custom software. For example, Strange Company uses Take Over GL Face Skins to add more facial expressions to their characters filmed in BioWare's 2002 role-playing video game Neverwinter Nights. Similarly, Atussa Simon used a "library of faces" for characters in The Battle of Xerxes. Some software, such as Epic Games' Impersonator for Unreal Tournament 2004 and Valve's Faceposer for Source games, have been provided by the developer. Another solution is to blend in non-machinima elements, as nGame did by inserting painted characters with more expressive faces into its 1999 film Berlin Assassins. It may be possible to point the camera elsewhere or employ other creative cinematography or acting. For example, Tristan Pope combined creative character and camera positioning with video editing to suggest sexual actions in his controversial film Not Just Another Love Story.

== Legal issues ==
New machinima filmmakers often want to use game-provided digital assets, but doing so raises legal issues. As derivative works, their films could violate copyright or be controlled by the assets' copyright holder, an arrangement that can be complicated by separate publishing and licensing rights. The software license agreement for The Movies stipulates that Activision, the game's publisher, owns "any and all content within... Game Movies that was either supplied with the Program or otherwise made available... by Activision or its licensors..." Some game companies provide software to modify their own games, and machinima makers often cite fair use as a defense, but the issue has never been tested in court. A potential problem with this defense is that many works, such as Red vs. Blue, focus more on satire, which is not as explicitly protected by fair use as parody. Berkeley adds that, even if machinima artists use their own assets, their works could be ruled derivative if filmed in a proprietary engine. The risk inherent in a fair-use defense would cause most machinima artists simply to yield to a cease-and-desist order. The AMAS has attempted to negotiate solutions with video game companies, arguing that an open-source or reasonably priced alternative would emerge from an unfavorable situation. Unlike The Movies, some dedicated machinima software programs, such as Reallusion's iClone, have licenses that avoid claiming ownership of users' films featuring bundled assets.

Generally, companies want to retain creative control over their intellectual properties and are wary of fan-created works, like fan fiction. However, because machinima provides free marketing, they have avoided a response demanding strict copyright enforcement. In 2003, Linden Lab was praised for changing license terms to allow users to retain ownership of works created in its virtual world Second Life. Rooster Teeth initially tried to release Red vs. Blue unnoticed by Halo's owners because they feared that any communication would force them to end the project. However, Microsoft, Bungie's parent company at the time, contacted the group shortly after episode 2, and allowed them to continue without paying licensing fees.

A case in which developer control was asserted involved Blizzard Entertainment's action against Tristan Pope's Not Just Another Love Story. Blizzard's community managers encouraged users to post game movies and screenshots, but viewers complained that Pope's suggestion of sexual actions through creative camera and character positioning was pornographic. Citing the user license agreement, Blizzard closed discussion threads about the film and prohibited links to it. Although Pope accepted Blizzard's right to some control, he remained concerned about censorship of material that already existed in-game in some form. Discussion ensued about boundaries between MMORPG player and developer control. Lowood asserted that this controversy demonstrated that machinima could be a medium of negotiation for players.

=== Microsoft and Blizzard ===
In August 2007, Microsoft issued its Game Content Usage Rules, a license intended to address the legal status of machinima based on its games, including the Halo series. Microsoft intended the rules to be "flexible", and, because it was unilateral, the license was legally unable to reduce rights. However, machinima artists, such as Edgeworks Entertainment, protested the prohibitions on extending Microsoft's fictional universes (a common component of fan fiction) and on selling anything from sites hosting derivative works. Compounding the reaction was the license's statement, "If you do any of these things, you can expect to hear from Microsoft's lawyers who will tell you that you have to stop distributing your items right away."

Surprised by the negative feedback, Microsoft revised and reissued the license after discussion with Hugh Hancock and an attorney for the Electronic Frontier Foundation. The rules allow noncommercial use and distribution of works derived from Microsoft-owned game content, except audio effects and soundtracks. The license prohibits reverse engineering and material that is pornographic or otherwise "objectionable". On distribution, derivative works that elaborate on a game's fictional universe or story are automatically licensed to Microsoft and its business partners. This prevents legal problems if a fan and Microsoft independently conceive similar plots.

A few weeks later, Blizzard Entertainment posted on WorldofWarcraft.com their "Letter to the Machinimators of the World", a license for noncommercial use of game content. It differs from Microsoft's declaration in that it addresses machinima specifically instead of general game-derived content, allows use of game audio if Blizzard can legally license it, requires derivative material to meet the Entertainment Software Rating Board's Teen content rating guideline, defines noncommercial use differently, and does not address extensions of fictional universes.

Hayes states that, although licensees' benefits are limited, the licenses reduce reliance on fair use regarding machinima. In turn, this recognition may reduce film festivals' concerns about copyright clearance. In an earlier analogous situation, festivals were concerned about documentary films until best practices for them were developed. According to Hayes, Microsoft and Blizzard helped themselves through their licenses because fan creations provide free publicity and are unlikely to harm sales. If the companies had instead sued for copyright infringement, defendants could have claimed estoppel or implied license because machinima had been unaddressed for a long time. Thus, these licenses secured their issuers' legal rights. Even though other companies, such as Electronic Arts, have encouraged machinima, they have avoided licensing it. Because of the involved legal complexity, they may prefer to under-enforce copyrights. Hayes believes that this legal uncertainty is a suboptimal solution and that, though limited and "idiosyncratic", the Microsoft and Blizzard licenses move towards an ideal video gaming industry standard for handling derivative works.

== Semiotic mode ==
Just as machinima can be the cause of legal dispute in copyright ownership and illegal use, it makes heavy use of intertextuality and raises the question of authorship. Machinima takes copyrighted property (such as characters in a game engine) and repurposes it to tell a story, but another common practice in machinima-making is to retell an existing story from a different medium in that engine.

This re-appropriation of established texts, resources, and artistic properties to tell a story or make a statement is an example of a semiotic phenomenon known as intertextuality or resemiosis. A more common term for this phenomenon is "parody", but not all of these intertextual productions are intended for humor or satire, as demonstrated by the Few Good G-Men video. Furthermore, the argument of how well-protected machinima is under the guise of parody or satire is still highly debated. A piece of machinima may be reliant upon a protected property, but may not necessarily be making a statement about that property. Therefore, it is more accurate to refer to it simply as resemiosis, because it takes an artistic work and presents it in a new way, form, or medium. This resemiosis can be manifested in a number of ways. The machinima-maker can be considered an author who restructures the story and/or the world that the chosen game engine is built around. In the popular web series Red vs. Blue, most of the storyline takes place within the game engine of Halo: Combat Evolved and its subsequent sequels. Halo: Combat Evolved has an extensive storyline already, but Red vs. Blue only ever makes mention of this storyline once in the first episode. Even after over 200 episodes of the show being broadcast onto the Internet since 2003, the only real similarities that can be drawn between Red vs. Blue and the game-world it takes place in are the character models, props, vehicles, and settings. Yet Burnie Burns and the machinima team at Rooster Teeth created an extensive storyline of their own using these game resources.

The ability to re-appropriate a game engine to film a video demonstrates intertextuality because it is an obvious example of art being a product of creation-through-manipulation rather than creation per se. The art historian Ernst Gombrich likened art to the "manipulation of a vocabulary" and this can be demonstrated in the creation of machinima. When using a game world to create a story, the author is influenced by the engine. For example, since so many video games are built around the concept of war, a significant portion of machinima films also take place in war-like environments.

Intertextuality is further demonstrated in machinima not only in the re-appropriation of content but in artistic and communicatory techniques. Machinima by definition is a form of puppetry, and thus this new form of digital puppetry employs age-old techniques from the traditional artform. It is also, however, a form of filmmaking, and must employ filmmaking techniques such as camera angles and proper lighting. Some machinima takes place in online environments with participants, actors, and "puppeteers" working together from thousands of miles apart. This means other techniques born from long-distance communication must also be employed. Thus, techniques and practices that would normally never be used in conjunction with one another in the creation of an artistic work end up being used intertextually in the creation of machinima.

Another way that machinima demonstrates intertextuality is in its tendency to make frequent references to texts, works, and other media just like TV ads or humorous cartoons such as The Simpsons might do. For example, the machinima series Freeman's Mind, created by Ross Scott, is filmed by taking a recording of Scott playing through the game Half Life as a player normally would and combining it with a voiceover (also recorded by Scott) to emulate an inner monologue of the normally voiceless protagonist Gordon Freeman. Scott portrays Freeman as a snarky, sociopathic character who makes frequent references to works and texts including science fiction, horror films, action movies, American history, and renowned novels such as Moby Dick. These references to works outside the game, often triggered by events within the game, are prime examples of the densely intertextual nature of machinima.

== Common genres ==
Nitsche and Lowood describe two methods of approaching machinima: starting from a video game and seeking a medium for expression or for documenting gameplay ("inside-out"), and starting outside a game and using it merely as animation tool ("outside-in"). Kelland, Morris, and Lloyd similarly distinguish between works that retain noticeable connections to games, and those closer to traditional animation. Belonging to the former category, gameplay and stunt machinima began in 1997 with Quake done Quick. Although not the first speedrunners, its creators used external software to manipulate camera positions after recording, which, according to Lowood, elevated speedrunning "from cyberathleticism to making movies". Stunt machinima remains popular. Kelland, Morris, and Lloyd state that Halo: Combat Evolved stunt videos offer a new way to look at the game, and compare Battlefield 1942 machinima creators to the Harlem Globetrotters. Built-in features for video editing and post-recording camera positioning in Halo 3 were expected to facilitate gameplay-based machinima. MMORPGs and other virtual worlds have been captured in documentary films, such as Miss Galaxies 2004, a beauty pageant that took place in the virtual world of Star Wars Galaxies. Footage was distributed in the cover disc of the August 2004 issue of PC Gamer. Douglas Gayeton's Molotov Alva and His Search for the Creator documents the title character's interactions in Second Life.

Gaming-related comedy offers another possible entry point for new machinima producers. Presented as five-minute sketches, many machinima comedies are analogous to Internet Flash animations. After Clan Undead's 1997 work Operation Bayshield built on the earliest Quake movies by introducing narrative conventions of linear media and sketch comedy reminiscent of the television show Saturday Night Live, the New-York-based ILL Clan further developed the genre in machinima through works including Apartment Huntin' and Hardly Workin'. Red vs. Blue: The Blood Gulch Chronicles chronicles a futile civil war over five seasons and 100 episodes. Marino wrote that although the series' humor was rooted in video games, strong writing and characters caused the series to "transcend the typical gamer". An example of a comedy film that targets a more general audience is Strange Company's Tum Raider, produced for the BBC in 2004.

Machinima has been used in music videos, of which the first documented example is Ken Thain's 2002 "Rebel vs. Thug", made in collaboration with Chuck D. For this, Thain used Quake2Max, a modification of Quake II that provided cel-shaded animation. The following year, Tommy Pallotta directed "In the Waiting Line" for the British group Zero 7. He told Computer Graphics World, "It probably would have been quicker to do the film in a 3D animated program. But now, we can reuse the assets in an improvisational way." Scenes of the game Postal 2 can be seen in the music video of the Black Eyed Peas single "Where Is the Love?". In television, MTV features video game characters on its show Video Mods. Among World of Warcraft players, dance and music videos became popular after dancing animations were discovered in the game.

Others use machinima in drama. These works may or may not retain signs of their video game provenance. Unreal Tournament is often used for science fiction and Battlefield 1942 for war, but some artists subvert their chosen game's setting or completely detach their work from it. In 1999, Strange Company used Quake II in Eschaton: Nightfall, a horror film based on the work of H. P. Lovecraft (although Quake I was also based on the Lovecraft lore). A later example is Damien Valentine's series Consanguinity, made using BioWare's 2002 computer game Neverwinter Nights and based on the television series Buffy the Vampire Slayer. Another genre consists of experimental works that attempt to push the boundaries of game engines. One example, Fountainhead's Anna, is a short film that focuses on the cycle of life and is reminiscent of Fantasia. Other productions go farther and completely eschew a 3D appearance. Friedrich Kirschner's The Tournament and The Journey deliberately appear hand-drawn, and Dead on Que's Fake Science resembles two-dimensional Eastern European modernist animation from the 1970s.

Another derivative genre termed machinima verite, from cinéma vérité, seeks to add a documentary and additional realism to the machinima piece. L.M. Sabo's CATACLYSM achieves a machinima verite style through displaying and recapturing the machinima video with a low resolution black and white hand-held video camera to produce a shaky camera effect. Other element of cinéma vérité, such as longer takes, sweeping camera transitions, and jump cuts may be included to complete the effect.

Some have used machinima to make political statements, often from left-wing perspectives. Alex Chan's take on the 2005 civil unrest in France, The French Democracy, attained mainstream attention and inspired other machinima commentaries on American and British society. Horwatt deemed Thuyen Nguyen's 2006 An Unfair War, a criticism of the Iraq War, similar in its attempt "to speak for those who cannot". Joshua Garrison mimicked Chan's "political pseudo-documentary style" in his Virginia Tech Massacre, a controversial Halo 3–based re-enactment and explanation of the eponymous real-life events. More recently, War of Internet Addiction addressed internet censorship in China using World of Warcraft.

== Competitions ==
After the QML's Quake Movie Oscars, dedicated machinima awards did not reappear until the AMAS created the Mackies for its first Machinima Film Festival in 2002. The annual festival has become an important one for machinima creators. Ho Chee Yue, a founder of the marketing company AKQA, helped to organize the first festival for the Asia chapter of the AMAS in 2006. In 2007, the AMAS supported the first machinima festival held in Europe. In addition to these smaller ceremonies, Hugh Hancock of Strange Company worked to add an award for machinima to the more general Bitfilm Festival in 2003. Other general festivals that allow machinima include the Sundance Film Festival, the Florida Film Festival, and the New Media Film Festival. The Ottawa International Animation Festival opened a machinima category in 2004, but, citing the need for "a certain level of excellence", declined to award anything to the category's four entries that year.

The Milan Machinima Festival (MMF) is an annual event in Italy focused on machinima, spotlighting filmmakers who use video games and real-time technologies to create moving image works. Dedicated to exploring the intersections of video art, cinema, animation, and gaming, the festival presents a curated selection of machinima works chosen by an international jury for their cultural significance, artistic innovation, and experimental approach, alongside an open call for emerging creators and a program of lectures, seminars, workshops, and publications.

The 69th Internationale Kurzfilmtage Oberhausen that was held from April 26 to May 1, 2023 presented "Against Gravity. The Art of Machinima" as its central thematic programme, the first major film festival to dedicate extensive programming to machinima.

Machinima has been showcased in contests sponsored by game companies. Epic Games' popular Make Something Unreal contest included machinima that impressed event organizer Jeff Morris because of "the quality of entries that really push the technology, that accomplish things that Epic never envisioned". In December 2005, Blizzard Entertainment and Xfire, a gaming-focused instant messaging service, jointly sponsored a World of Warcraft machinima contest.

== Mainstream appearances ==
A scene from a machinima portion of "Make Love, Not Warcraft"

Machinima has appeared on television, starting with the G4 series Portal. MTV2's Video Mods re-creates music videos using characters from video games such as The Sims 2, BloodRayne, and Tribes. Blizzard Entertainment helped to set part of "Make Love, Not Warcraft", an Emmy Award–winning 2006 episode of the comedy series South Park, in its massively multiplayer online role-playing game (MMORPG) World of Warcraft. By purchasing broadcast rights to Douglas Gayeton's machinima documentary Molotov Alva and His Search for the Creator in September 2007, HBO became the first television network to buy a work created completely in a virtual world. In December 2008, machinima.com signed fifteen experienced television comedy writers—including Patric Verrone, Bill Oakley, and Mike Rowe—to produce episodes for the site.

Commercial use of machinima has increased. Rooster Teeth sells DVDs of their Red vs. Blue series and, under sponsorship from Electronic Arts, helped to promote The Sims 2 by using the game to make a machinima series, The Strangerhood. Volvo Cars sponsored the creation of a 2004 advertisement, Game: On, the first film to combine machinima and live action. Later, Electronic Arts commissioned Rooster Teeth to promote their Madden NFL 07 video game. Blockhouse TV uses Moviestorm's machinima software to produce its pre-school educational DVD series Jack and Holly

Game developers have continued to increase support for machinima. Products such as Lionhead Studios' 2005 business simulation game The Movies, Linden Research's virtual world Second Life, and Bungie's 2007 first-person shooter Halo 3 encourage the creation of user content by including machinima software tools. Using The Movies, Alex Chan, a French resident with no previous filmmaking experience, took four days to create The French Democracy, a short political film about the 2005 civil unrest in France. Third-party mods like Garry's Mod usually offer the ability to manipulate characters and take advantage of custom or migrated content, allowing for the creation of works like Counter-Strike For Kids that can be filmed using assets from multiple games.

In a 2010 interview with PC Magazine, Valve CEO and co-founder Gabe Newell said that they wanted to make a Half-Life feature film themselves, rather than hand it off to a big-name director like Sam Raimi, and that their recent Team Fortress 2 "Meet The Team" machinima shorts were experiments in doing just that. Two years later, Valve released their proprietary non-linear machinima software, Source Filmmaker.

Machinima has also been used for music video clips. The first machinima music video to air on MTV is that of Zero 7's "In the Waiting Line" in 2003, animated in the id Tech 3 engine by Tommy Pallotta. Second Life virtual artist Bryn Oh created a work for Australian performer Megan Bernard's song "Clean Up Your Life", released in 2016. The first music video for 2018's "Old Town Road", by Lil Nas X, was composed entirely of footage from the 2018 Western action-adventure game Red Dead Redemption 2.

== See also ==
- 1996 in machinima
- 2003 in machinima
- 2004 in machinima
- 2005 in machinima
- 2006 in machinima
- 2007 in machinima
- 3D Movie Maker
- Computer animation
- Computer-generated imagery
- Overwatch and pornography
- The Flying Luna Clipper
