= The French Democracy =

2005 French short film

- A scene from The French Democracy, showing dialogue in English subtitles and the three central youths of the film
- Game: The Movies
- Genre: Political
- Running time: 13 min.
- Created by: Alex Chan
- Production company: Atomic Prod
- Release(s): 22 November 2005
- Formats: QuickTime, WMV

The French Democracy is a 2005 English-language French short political film made by Alex Chan using computer animation from Lionhead Studios' 2005 business simulation game The Movies. The plot centers on three Moroccan men who turn to rioting after facing different forms of discrimination. Chan, a French native of Chinese descent, created the film to convey his view that racism caused the riots of the 2005 civil unrest in France. Although Chan was restricted by shortcomings and technical limitations in The Movies, he finished the film after four days of production.

The film was uploaded to The Movies Online, Lionhead's website for user-created videos, on 22 November 2005 and was soon covered by American and French press. Although real-time-rendered, three-dimensional computer animation (machinima) had been used in earlier political films, The French Democracy attained an unprecedented level of mainstream attention for political machinima. While acknowledging the film's flaws, such as the grammatically poor English subtitles, commentators praised its clear political message and compared it to films such as La Haine and Do the Right Thing. The French Democracy inspired other politically conscious machinima works and fueled discussion about the art form's potential for political expression. Some raised concerns that video game companies would use their copyrights to control the content of derivative machinima films.

== Synopsis ==
The French Democracy begins with a re-enactment of the real-life 27 October 2005 event that triggered riots in France: the electrocution of two teenagers, Zyed Benna and Bouna Traoré. In the film, the youths attempt to hide from police in a building near an electric power station. In a televised speech, the Minister of the Interior vows to increase efforts to fight crime. Three fictional Moroccan men discuss the recent events and disagree with means used by the police, and feel that blacks are unfairly targeted. They face different forms of discrimination: overnight detention for lack of a passport during an identity check, refusal of employment and housing rental, and police brutality. Angered, the three riot using Molotov cocktails. A white family watches television coverage of the chaos, and the film ends with a dedication to Benna and Traoré, lamenting the loss of the French ideals of freedom, equality, and fraternity.

== Background and production ==
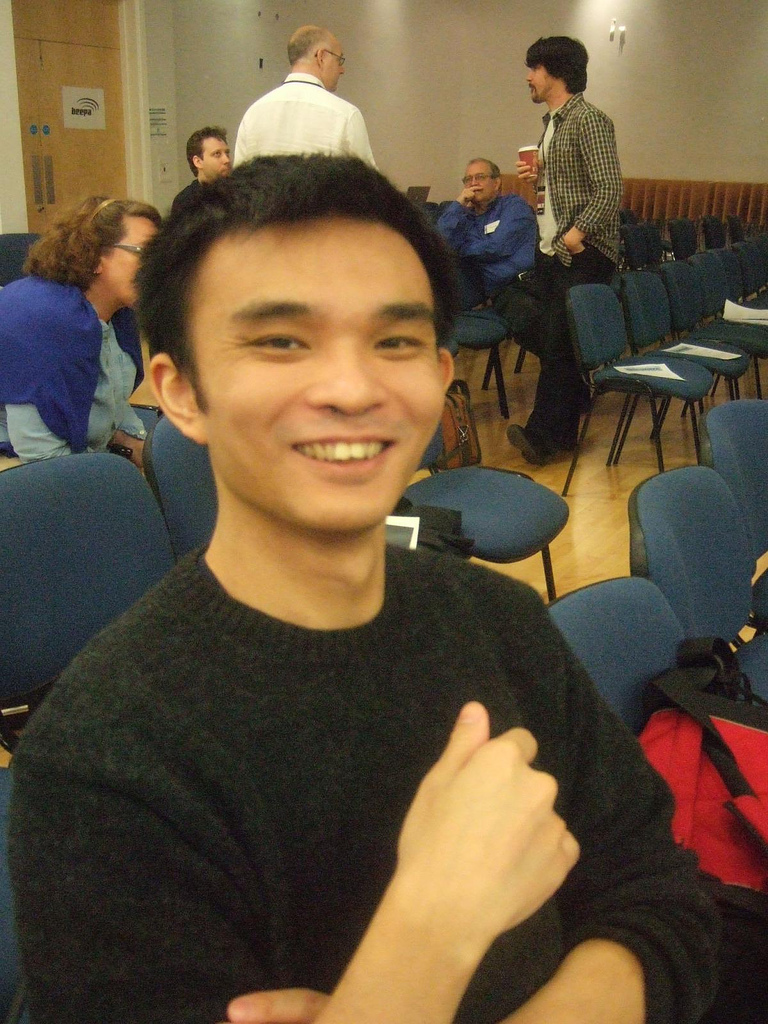
Alex Chan, the creator of The French Democracy, had no previous film-making experience.

Alex Chan, 27 years old at the time of the civil unrest, was a French-born freelance industrial designer whose parents were Chinese immigrants from Hong Kong. Although Chan was successful professionally, he felt that there was racial and cultural discrimination in France, based on his own previous attempts to find housing and violence directed towards him. He lived in Seine-Saint-Denis, a suburb of Paris, near housing projects where rioting had caused the destruction of cars owned by acquaintances. In the aftermath of the unrest, Chan was dissatisfied, stating that "the media, especially in the United States, ... linked what was happening, the riots, to terrorism and put the blame on the Muslim community". Chan wanted instead to depict "more human" rioters who turned to violence in response to racism. According to Chan, the title The French Democracy is meant to be ironic, in that the youths express themselves by rioting rather than through the political system. He elaborated:

[The French Democracy is] a shortcut made with The Movies technology about the recent events concerning riots in French suburbs. This movie is trying to help people have a better understanding of the origin of these events, as some reasons that pushed all this youth to have such violent acts. As a matter of fact TFD offers a sincere inside view from a French citizen who lives in one of these neighborhoods where the riots took place. This fictional documentary is strongly inspired by real events and reactions and tries to make the spectator think more about how French society could and should potentially be.

Although he had no previous film-making experience, Chan decided to make his public statement as a film after he bought The Movies, a business simulation game released by Lionhead Studios on 8 November. After he progressed in the game far enough to unlock the desired film-making tools, he switched to Sandbox mode, in which he completed the film in three or four days. Because Chan had no computer microphone, the film presents dialogue in English subtitles. Despite his lack of fluency, he chose English to broaden his audience. Production was also affected by the limitations of The Movies. Restricted to the scenery provided by the software, Chan set the electrocution deaths in a shack. The game's Manhattan-based setting forced him to approximate the Paris Métro with the New York City Subway and to include the Empire State Building in the background. Given the game's choices for skin color, Chan needed to apply the lightest pigment available for blacks to one character.

== Reception ==
Under the pseudonym Koulamata, Chan uploaded the finished film to The Movies Online on 22 November 2005. Some viewers praised it, but others criticized the poor subtitles or the portrayal of police action against minorities. According to Libération, criticism was stronger in France than elsewhere. Lionhead's selection of The French Democracy as a "hot pick" led to redistribution from other Internet sites, followed by coverage in mainstream media—including The Washington Post, BusinessWeek, USA Today, and Libération. The Washington Post and MTV originally created religious connotations by incorrectly labeling Chan's characters as Muslims; they issued corrected stories after Chan complained. In 2006, the film was shown at the Flash Festival at Centre Georges Pompidou and at the World Wide Short Film Festival in Toronto.

By Chan's own assessment, The French Democracy is unpolished. The Washington Post found "broken English" in the subtitles, and BusinessWeek deemed them "stilted and ungrammatical". Josh Lee of PopMatters deemed the character animations of The Movies too exaggerated for the film's serious message; he felt that they made the film's depiction of police brutality seem better suited for the silent film comedy series Keystone Cops. Alterités, a French Internet publication about media issues related to immigration, called the characters "très ethnicisés" (very ethnicized).

However, some critics felt that these problems with production quality helped to convey the film's message. In a MétaMorphoses article, Franck Beau considered the film's aesthetic a strong point because, having originated in video games, it completely differed from those of traditional animation and filming. He argued that the work's power lay in its "simplicité extrême" (extreme simplicity) and in the "fonctionnement logique" (logical operation) of the underlying video game. BusinessWeek wrote that "the combination of amateurish technique and a strong emotional message is oddly moving", and Henry Lowood of Stanford University similarly thought that the awkward subtitles and cinematography created a sense of authenticity. Lee found a filming precedent in Mathieu Kassovitz's 1995 work La Haine, also "lauded for its low-budget aesthetic as much as for its expressions of rage, fear, and alienation". A discussion panel at the AMAS' 2006 Machinima Film Festival compared Chan's work to Do the Right Thing (1989) and The Battle of Algiers (1966).

== Legacy ==
Although earlier political machinima films existed, The French Democracy attained an unprecedented level of mainstream attention, according to Paul Marino, executive director of the Academy of Machinima Arts & Sciences (AMAS). Based on the interest, Marino considered adding a documentary or commentary category to the AMAS' awards. Xavier Lardy, founder of machinima.fr, stated that no previous machinima work had "such a clear and prominent political message". Others further contrasted The French Democracy's serious nature with the prevalence of gaming-related references in other machinima works, such as the Leeroy Jenkins video and Rooster Teeth Productions' comedy series Red vs. Blue: The Blood Gulch Chronicles. Berkeley stated that The French Democracy was a rare exception to machinima's basis in "accepted cinematic and televisual conventions".

The French Democracy was, according to Alterités, "evidence that 'technological innovations are being used to satisfy the thirst for public expression", and Olli Sotamaa felt that the work justified further research into connections between citizenship and video gaming. Peter Molyneux, chief executive officer of Lionhead Studios, praised Chan's "timely and poignant" work for inspiring other commentary films on American and British society and for "demonstrating the potential power and impact that these films can have". In CineAction, Elijah Horwatt wrote that Thuyen Nguyen's 2006 An Unfair War, a criticism of the Iraq War, similarly attempts "to speak for those who cannot". Joshua Garrison mimicked Chan's "political pseudo-documentary style" in his Virginia Tech Massacre, a controversial Halo 3–based re-enactment of the eponymous real-life event. Although initially undecided, Chan eventually became a professional machinima film-maker. His later work includes World of Electors, a series about the 2007 French presidential election.

Writing for The Escapist, Allen Varney felt that the political awareness was overstated because the percentage of The Movies films that offered social commentary remained small and because the machinima and political communities were mostly separate. He argued that machinima's outstanding copyright issues and possible marginalization constrained potential for expression. Marino and others added concerns that, although game developers had condoned machinima, a controversial film could prompt them to control machinima content by enforcing their copyrights.
