= Stunt Island =

1992 video game

- Developer: The Assembly Line
- Publishers: NA: Walt Disney Computer Software; EU: Infogrames
- Designers: Ronald J. Fortier; Adrian Stephens
- Writers: Patrick Gilmore; Scott Cuthbertson
- Composer: Doug Brandon
- Platform: MS-DOS
- Release: 1992
- Genre: Flight simulator
- Mode: Single-player

Stunt Island is a flight simulation video game for MS-DOS PCs released in 1992. It was designed by Adrian Stephens and Ronald J. Fortier and published by Walt Disney Computer Software. The game, marketed as "The Stunt Flying and Filming Simulation", provides an island which contains a number of different film sets, such as a large city, various small towns, airports, oil rigs, a canyon, an aircraft carrier, and many others locations situated on a fictional island off southern California. There is a free flight mode, where the player can simply fly around in a variety of different aircraft which have unique flying characteristics and flight envelopes. Additionally, the player can position cameras and props around these sets, and create triggers to start actions including the camera panning and an object moving. The game also has an editing mode where the player can splice together taped footage and insert sound effects. The game world is small and it is impossible to leave the area of the island without returning to it. The game runs well under DosBox from ver. 0.65 to present. The game was heavily patched more than a year following its initial release. The last patch, V3 removed copyright protection and addressed many issues. GOG.com released an emulated version for Microsoft Windows, Mac OS X and Linux in 2016. This GOG version, and the one offered by Steam, appear to be the unpatched ver. 1.0 release of the game.

== Game components ==
=== Game engine ===
The game engine for Stunt Island was co-developed by The Assembly Line. It is capable of simultaneously rendering several hundred simple 3D objects on a typical early 1990s PC with 386 processor at 33 MHz with two megabytes of RAM.

The graphics of the game are rendered in 256 colors at 320x200 resolution (VGA) and the airplanes are shaded using Gouraud shading.

=== Stunt coordinator ===
When a player does not wish to create a stunt from scratch, he or she may go to the Stunt Coordinator on Stunt Island. The Stunt Coordinator possesses a built-in list of 32 stunt scenes. If the player is participating in the optional Stunt Pilot of the Year competition, these stunts must be completed to improve ranking.

=== Set design ===
In set design, a player may place props, cameras, and collideable triggers. Conditional and timed events may also be created to perform particular actions.

=== Flight simulator ===
While actually filming a stunt, the player's controls are that of a flight simulator. There is an airfield in the game where the player can select a plane and fly around Stunt Island to scout different locations.

=== Editing room ===
In the editing room the player is able to take previously recorded footage and splice them together into a single movie. Sound effects and music may also be added.

=== Theater ===
Movies may be watched in this room. Such movies may come with the game, be created by the player, or be downloaded from the Internet. The game also comes with a tool called MAKEONE which may be used to generate a self-contained version of a movie, which may be played on a machine without the game by using the PLAYONE tool.

== Reception ==
Computer Gaming World in 1993 praised Stunt Island's graphics, ease of use, editing features, and variety of aircraft, concluding that "it represents the future of simulation products [and] also a step toward a future where films can be created completely on the microcomputer". That year the magazine gave it a Special Award for Innovation, and nominated it for Simulation Game of the Year. The game also received a Critics Choice Award for Best Consumer Product from the Software Publishers Association, and was nominated for an award at the 1993 Game Developers Conference.

In 1994, PC Gamer UK named Stunt Island the 45th best computer game of all time. The editors wrote, "A great little package, but as with many 'games' of this type, its rewards are only visible if you're willing to invest time and effort. We strongly recommend you do just that."

== See also ==
- Machinima
- The Movies
- List of Disney video games
