= Bryn Oh =

Canadian artist

Bryn Oh is a contemporary virtual world artist known for interactive installations and immersive experiences in virtual environments such as Second Life, Sansar, Steam, and High Fidelity. Oh has been active in the virtual world community since 2007, and is considered one of the pioneers in the field of virtual art.

Oh's work often explores themes of identity, memory, and the relationship between technology and humanity. Their style of artmaking, which they call Immersiva, blends elements of surrealism, fantasy, and storytelling to create captivating and thought-provoking experiences for audiences. In addition to virtual installations that are viewed by an average of 30,000 to 40,000 visitors, Oh has also exhibited work in physical art galleries and museums, expanding the impact and relevance of virtual art in the contemporary art world.

== Education ==
Oh's human alter ego studied fine art at Ontario College of Art & Design University, receiving the George A Reid award for painting. They later studied computer animation and learned how to use computer graphics programs such as Softimage XSI and Zbrush.

== Style, themes, and notable artworks ==
Outside of Second Life, Oh's human counterpart is a Toronto, Canada-based oil painter, whose large-scale, colorful paintings with chaotic brushstrokes are intended to affect the viewer's perception, cognition and emotional response.

Oh began exploring the metaverse around 2007. Their work on Second Life and other virtual reality platforms has evolved from static sculptural installations, such as steampunk inspired insects to immersive, wide scale environments that envelop residents of the platform through an interplay of narrative elements, aesthetic objects and interactive gameplay. They explain that: "All my work starting from 2009 is one long story with each new artwork being a chapter in that story.” Oh's own persona is a concept. Their anonymous human creator developed them to see whether a pixel-based artist could become as successful and accepted as an artist in real life.

Oh's work in Second Life is characterized by its narrative-driven, atmospheric, and typically haunting surreal environments. These installations usually combine elements of sculpture, painting, poetry, film, and sound to create immersive experiences. The themes explored in Oh's work address topics of identity, memory, the human condition, and the blurred line between technology and reality. Oh calls this style of artwork Immersiva, due to the way their environmental installations enable visitors to immerse themselves by meandering through vast, open-ended narratives with cinematic-like production. Immersiva is also the name of Oh's site-specific region in Second Life, where residents of the platform can view their current work. They utilize a technique called machinima to make animated narrative films from computer graphics by utilizing the game engines from Second Life and Sansar and Unreal Engine.

One of Oh's earliest immersiva works created in the metaverse is a trilogy consisting of The Daughter of Gears (2008), Rabbicorn (2009), and Standby (2010). These works depict a melancholy aesthetic narrative of loss and grief, wherein a mother tries to save her dying daughter by transferring her soul into a machine. Notable subsequent works include Lady Carmagnolle (2017), Hand (2019), Imogen and the Pigeons (2013), Singularity of Kumiko (2014), PTSD Virtual Environment (2014), Pretty (2020), Brittle Epoch (2021), and Lobby Cam (2022).

Lady Carmagnolle is a single-scene performative poem presented as a machinima.

Hand is the first part of a trilogy of virtual worlds and machinimas created in Second Life, Sansar, and Unreal Engine. It tells the tale of a not too distant future where society has fully transitioned into existing in the virtual realm, living as the personas they desire to be, and leaving their physical bodies behind. A group of children who are excluded from this utopian scenario have to fend for themselves and make sense of their situation and the human condition by piecing together information discovered in artifacts from the past, such as Dick and Jane novels.

Brittle Epoch is the second chapter of Hand, and follows two of the girls from Hand named Flutter and Juniper, on a long journey from the city to the suburbs, discovering the physical ruins that civilization left behind when they entered their digital nirvana.

Imogen and the Pigeons depicts the ruins of a society that uses technology to record people's life experiences and memories onto computers in a digital format. Imogen and the Pigeons is a poetic story that takes place inside the digital recording of a woman named Imogen's life.

Singularity of Kumiko is a participatory-based immersive installation in Second Life that has subsequently been turned into a machinima. The environment is dark and moody, to complement the melancholy narrative. There is some ambient light emanating from the artwork, but it is juxtaposed by a pitch black background, so visitors navigate the exhibition with a headlamp. Oh gives the visitors instructions for how to use their gear and where to begin their journey. As the participants move through the installation they collect information and artifacts that uncover a dialogue between two characters, Kumiko and Iktomi, learning that one was in a coma from a car accident, and though a virtual technology is being encouraged to cross over by the other. There is also an element of danger lurking in the dark environment, a rabbit named Mr. Zippers who can “kill” the participant.

Pretty is a poetic machinima, created in Second Life, of an encounter between two versions of a manufactured woman, while exploring technology and obsolescence through a humanist lens. The characters are humanoid in their design. Oh explains that their proportions, a 1 to 9 body ratio, are intentionally warped in order to signify their manufactured state. They state that “The average person has a 1/5 to 1/7 ratio depending on the location in the world they come from but, much like a photoshopped model on a magazine cover, these realities can be warped."

PTSD Virtual Environment was developed on Second Life after Oh was contacted by the non-profit organization Virtual Ability, which helps individuals with a wide range of disabilities learn to thrive in online virtual worlds. The concept is to help the soldiers suffering from PTSD learn how to do things that might be difficult for them because of the effects of their trauma. Examples include planning a camping trip by going to a few different stores in the virtual environment to buy equipment. Then performing relaxing activities like fishing. Additionally, the environment made it possible for soldiers to connect with psychologists in a safe and virtual setting.

Lobby Cam manifested as an expressive metaphor for the isolation and loneliness that resulted from social distancing and quarantine efforts during the COVID-19 pandemic. The work has been supported by a grant from the Canada Council for the Arts. Viewers become a part of the piece by walking through a lush rural landscape, discovering pages from an eccentric man's diary in order to determine the course of the narrative.

== Exhibitions, awards, and publications ==
Oh's work has been shown in both virtual and physical settings. Notable venues and events where their work has been presented include the exhibition Obedience at the Jewish Museum in Berlin (in collaboration British film director Peter Greenaway and multimedia artist Saskia Boddeke), The Final Five at Jack the Pelican Present in Brooklyn, New York, the Santa Fe New Media Festival, 17th Biennial de Cerveira in Portugal, the World Expo in Shanghai (Madrid Pavilion), and the Art & Algorithms digital festival in Titusville, Florida.

Oh has been the recipient of several grants and awards, including four grants from the Canadian government. In August 2023, Lobby Cam won the Best Machinima Award at the Touchstone Independent Film Festival. Oh's work in the metaverse has been discussed in academic journals and in the books Metaverse Artists: Bryn Oh by Velazquez Bonetto and New Opportunities for Artistic Practice in Virtual Worlds edited by Denise Doyle.
