= The Movies: Stunts & Effects =

2006 video game

- Developer: Lionhead Studios
- Publishers: Activision; Sega; Feral Interactive (Mac)
- Platforms: Windows, Mac OS X
- Release: 6 June 2006: Windows; NA: 6 June 2006; UK: 16 June 2006; Macintosh; WW: 8 January 2008; NA: 31 January 2008; EU: 30 March 2009
- Genre: Business simulation
- Mode: Single-player

The Movies: Stunts & Effects is 2006 expansion pack for the 2005 business simulation game The Movies, developed by Lionhead Studios and distributed by Activision Publishing for Microsoft Windows and Feral Interactive for Mac OS X. Upon release, the expansion was generally well received, with praise directed to its addition of new movie-making features, and criticism of its additions of stuntmen to the micromanagement involved in the game.

== Gameplay ==
Stunts and Effects adds a new mechanic to the game from 1960 in which players can hire stuntmen to perform stunts in scenes. Stuntmen have skills that can be trained and are required to perform stunts with a higher difficulty, with their success or failure affecting their physical condition and also the quality of the film. The expansion also introduces additions to the Advanced-Movie Making and Post Production modes, including a 'FreeCam' function allowing for greater control over camera angles, and camera overlays that places a layer over the screen in scenes to imitate weather effects or looking through items such as a camera or binoculars.

== Development ==
Development on an expansion pack to The Movies was announced by Lionhead Studios on 15 March 2006, and showcased by Activision at E3 in May 2006, including a ten-minute demo of the features of the expansion. Peter Molyneux stated that the design of the expansion was intended to integrate with the original game and appeal to different types of players: including new players, players midway through the game, and players who had completed the game and wanted to access the new moviemaking tools. The game was released on 6 June 2006 for Windows.

== Reception ==
Reception

Aggregate score
Aggregator	Score
Metacritic	78%

Review scores
Publication	Score
Eurogamer	8/10
G4	4/5
GameSpot	7.7
GameSpy	3.5/5
GameZone	8.7
IGN	8/10
PC Zone	84%
Inside Mac Games	8.5

According to review aggregator Metacritic, Stunts & Effects received a "generally favorable" reception from critics. Matt Peckham of Computer Gaming World considered the expansion's appeal depended on the player's interest in its new movie-making tools, otherwise considering it to have "minor updates" that "only amount to a few hours" of play.
