= The Seal of Nehahra =

2000 American film

- A scene from The Seal of Nehahra
- Engine: Modified DarkPlaces engine
- Genre: Action/Drama
- Running time: 235 minutes
- Directed by: J. Thaddeus Skubis
- Written by: J. Thaddeus Skubis
- Voices: J. Thaddeus Skubis
- Actor control: J. Thaddeus Skubis
- Edited by: J. Thaddeus Skubis
- Production company: Mindcrime Productions
- Release(s): August 6, 2000
- Format: Quake demo recording

The Seal of Nehahra is a 2000 American machinima film created by Mindcrime Productions as part of the Nehahra Project. Made using a modified version of id Software's 1996 first-person shooter computer game Quake and released over the Internet as a non-interactive game demo package, the film was the longest released Quake movie — as Quake-based machinima was known at the time. At a total length of three hours and fifty five minutes, it is the longest single-piece machinima production as of 2017. The film received high reviews from the major Quake movie review sites of the time, Psyk's Popcorn Jungle and The Cineplex.

The film serves as a backstory to the Nehahra fan-made single-player game, released on August 17, 2000, which is set five years after the events of Quake. The film also has an unofficial backstory to Quake. In his review of The Seal of Nehahra for The Cineplex, Stephen Lum wrote, "Many people were very upset about the plot of Quake, reasonably so, because there wasn't one." Paul Coates wrote in his review of the film for Psyk's Popcorn Jungle, "Some could say that it is basically the Quake plot, but with a lot more detail, and a lot of characters to move it along". The writer, J. Thaddeus Skubis, stated in his director's notes that "[he] told the story that Id (Software) wouldn't".

== Plot ==
The film begins in late 2109. At the Slipgate Complex in Dallas, Texas, the military are overseeing development of a teleporter called a Slipgate. The top-ranking officer at the installation is General Blake. Another General, McQuiggan, has sent detachments of Grunts and Enforcers to the Complex for security purposes; these being genetically engineered soldiers with lowered intelligence and a killing instinct, brought on by electronic brain implants. Blake threatens to resign unless the Grunts leave, as he believes that it is dangerous to toy with nature. The Enforcer commander shares his apprehensions. Another new arrival is Major "Bent" Benton, a swaggering officer whom the soldiers immediately dislike.

Eventually, the scientists perfect the Slipgate and begin using it to transport equipment between bases. The film then jumps ahead to 2110, when Major Bent unwisely orders the activation of an overheated Slipgate. The heat causes a malfunction which sends several crates of demolition equipment into another dimension, to an area which was occupied by an Ogre. The Slipgate automatically brings the Ogre back to the Complex, where it is met by a party of soldiers led by the misanthropic Sergeant Lawrence Maxwell, who has a supernatural ability to translate any language. It communicates its peaceful intent to Maxwell, but a God-fearing soldier mortally wounds it as it flees back to its home dimension through the Slipgate. His dying words identify the humans, as "naked Knights"—Knights being a militaristic, humanoid species that enforces control over the Ogres.

They report the murder to the Knights, who express dismay at Maxwell's translating abilities; this skill is exclusive to the Immortal race, which was thought to have died out. The Knights in turn report to the cultists of the god Shub-Niggurath, who order an invasion of the human dimension. Meanwhile, a military hearing was held to assess the aliens' intentions during the transporter incident, in which Maxwell defends the Ogre's innocence, but is discredited as a witness when Major Bent, using classified intel leaked to him by his father, Senator Bentley, reveals that Lieutenant Maxwell went against orders by retreating and persuading others to do the same during a doomed battle five years prior. The knights teleport to a base in Tucson and slaughter all of its occupants. While doing so, they discover that both Grunts and Enforcers can be bent to their will through their military implants. Using Jack Torres, an ex-Navy Seal with remote viewing abilities, Blake identifies Shub-Niggurath as the leader of the Knights. McQuiggan sends soldiers into the other dimension, including Maxwell and Corporal Phil, an annoying joker, against Blake's protests.

The residents of the dimension massacre the soldiers, except for Phil, who escapes, and Maxwell who is captured. The priests explain Maxwell's situation: he is dead by the mortal definition of the term, and will regain his Immortal powers and memories. He is treated well because Shub-Niggurath fears that he may revive his creator, her enemy, the god Nehahra. The memories enhance his misanthropic outlook, such that he now wants to annihilate humankind. He also allies with an underground resistance movement, led by an Ogre named Zin and a Gaunt named Priam who controls the realm's various portals, that aims to overthrow Shub-Niggurath. Doing so, however, requires a human.

Meanwhile, many of the soldiers are reassigned in light of the war against these creatures, except Major Bent, whose father denied his transfer request. Shortly thereafter, Grunts and Enforcers attack the Dallas Slipgate Complex. Blake and Torres escape into a safe room, where they figure out how Shub-Niggurath has been controlling the Grunts and Enforcers, but the Enforcer commander commits suicide to avoid being turned into a servant of Shub-Niggurath. After murdering Director Keith, the creator of the slipgates, Maxwell kills Major Bent as revenge for his previous abusive treatment. Phil has decided to avenge his comrades and invade the other dimension on his own, going through the Slipgate and slaughtering enemies by the hundreds. Maxwell overhears him on his helmet radio, and guides Phil through the levels of Quake until he reaches Shub-Niggurath's pit, which can only be unlocked by ancient runes found at the end of each of the four chapters of Quake. After helping Phil slay Chthon, the boss of the first chapter of Quake, Max travels to the deadly Realm of Shades, populated by Wraiths: the ghosts of Immortals who sift through the memories of the dead for clues of their creator, Nehahra. Max promises to help break Nehahra's curse on them by providing them with the soul of Shub-Niggurath, which would show them the location of Nehahra, in exchange for immortality.

Blake orders his amphibious war machines to attack the Knights and Ogres in order to help Phil. Having overheard that teleportation is the most deadly force in the universe, Maxwell sets up a Slipgate for Phil to go through and emerge at Shub-Niggurath's location. This defeats the god, and Phil survives. However, Maxwell has ambitions: he kills his resistance allies so he can take over the dimension with the help of the Wraiths. The film ends as the Immortal conspirators open a gigantic vault door to unleash Nehahra.

The Nehahra mod takes place five years later, where Max becomes ruler of the Quake dimension using powers granted to him by Nehahra, and human soldiers have set up a colony therein called Forge City. After hostile forces overrun the city, Jack Torres escapes and navigates through the levels of the Nehahra campaign with some help from the surviving soldiers, collecting power-up artifacts and slaying the hostile monsters he encounters. Among these include human-ogre hybrids, who have now begrudgingly accepted Maxwell's command after being created and later shunned by Archgaunt Hierarch Zagheida, the former cultist leader who was killed late in the film. After Jack kills General Ghoro, the leader of the knights from the film, Maxwell schemes to use him to kill Nehahra. For while Nehahra granted Maxwell far more power than he himself possesses, he also made Maxwell unable to kill him directly. Wanting to be beholden to no one, Max secretly guides Jack to Nehahra's Den, where Jack kills Nehahra. In the final level, Maxwell decides to take care of Jack Torres himself in a battle of "cat and mouse", but despite Maxwell's constant teleportation and multiple lives, Jack manages to finally slay the immortal human tyrant and free the innumerable spirits he held captive. With Max dead, Torres's life on Earth awaits him, but he can't help but feel taunted by a Gaunt proverb that Max repeated to Bent just before he ended his life: "Death is just the beginning".

== Production ==
The project took a year and a half to develop. J. Thaddeus Skubis, also known as Mindcrime, was responsible for writing, recording and editing the film, as well as performing the voice work for all characters. Most of the rest of the team worked on maps and coding for the project. As the modified QSG Quake demo format used in the engine was not compatible with the Quake demo editing software of the time, most of the external editing was performed via a Hex editor. Internally, the camera was mostly manually controlled by Skubis. A command was implemented into the game allowing a recording in progress to be paused and unpaused as needed. This required scenes to be performed with a single take; reshoots entailed re-recording the entire scene. Minor errors exist in some scenes due to Skubis' self-admitted lack of time or patience to reshoot some of the longer scenes.

Unlike those in conventional Quake movies, none of the characters were directly controlled by players. All characters and most of the dialogue was controlled by scripting or artificial intelligence; the latter was mainly used for combat scenes. This in itself provided problems, particularly during the scenes in which the character Phil battles through the maps of Quake; due to a bug, the character would frequently use a rocket launcher in close range combat instead of a nailgun. Skubis wrote of this "The suspension of disbelief suffered greatly when he gave a Fiend repeated hits at point blank near the end of the scene and didn't, well, die from his own splash damage."

== Reception ==
Paul Coates gave the film a rating of 10 and awarded the film the "Psyk's Popcorn Prize", reserved for the film he considers to be the "top movie on the PPJ", taking it from its previous recipient, A Warrior's Life.
