= The Strangerhood =

Web series by Rooster Teeth Productions

- The Strangerhood DVD cover. From left: Griggs, Dutchmiller, Tovar, Catherine, Wade, Dr. Chalmers, Nikki, and Sam.
- Games: The Sims 2 (Season 1 and Special Episodes), The Sims 4 (Season 2)
- Genre: Comedy
- Running time: 88 min. (total), excluding special videos
- Created by: Burnie Burns; Matt Hullum
- Voices: Burnie Burns; Matt Hullum; David Zellner; Joel Heyman; Dan Godwin; Lindsey Griffith; Brooke Hattabaugh; Paul Marino; Geoff Ramsey; Gus Sorola; Jordan Cwierz; Kyle Taylor; Ray Narvaez Jr. Caiti Ward; Kdin Jenzen; Yssa Badolia; Barbara Dunkelman; Lindsay Jones; Ashley Jenkins
- Release(s): Original series: October 18, 2004 – April 27, 2006; Revived series: September 29, 2015 – October 3, 2015
- Formats: DivX, WMV, QuickTime, DVD
- No. of episodes: 21, excluding special videos

The Strangerhood is a comedy web series created by Rooster Teeth Productions. The series is produced primarily by using the machinima technique of synchronizing video footage from video game to pre-recorded dialogue and other audio. The animation is created using the video game The Sims 2 as a parody of sitcoms and reality television. The series details the lives of eight "assorted stereotypes" who wake up living in a neighborhood called Strangerhood Lane, with no memory of who they are, where they are, or how they got there.

The Strangerhood is the second machinima series of four from Rooster Teeth Productions. It is preceded by Red vs. Blue: The Blood Gulch Chronicles and followed by PANICS. The series is a parody of popular culture, namely television shows such as Desperate Housewives, Lost, 24, and American Idol.

The episodes are released online at the Rooster Teeth and The Sims 2 websites, and a DVD of the first season was released on May 5, 2006, available from GameStop stores in the United States and online worldwide.

The second season was a stretch goal for the Lazer Team's indiegogo crowdfunding campaign. Season two consists of four episodes and was released as daily episodes from September 29, to October 3, 2015.

== Plot ==
One morning in the near future, a group of assorted stereotypes awake in a strange town with no memory of who they are or where they came from. Their only clues come from the assorted labels that hold their names (Wade's name badge and Sam's underwear) and a mysteriously creepy voice issuing from their televisions. Over the course of the season, they endure many trials including an unusual reality show kitchen task, a murder mystery among their group, a secret affair and of course their own strange personalities before they learn the horrifying truth behind the unusual events of the Strangerhood.

=== Strangerhood Studios ===
Strangerhood Studios is a series of shorts, each about one or two minutes long, featuring the characters of The Strangerhood. The story, however, departs from the main plot of The Strangerhood. For example, the characters are back in the outside world, not trapped on Strangerhood Lane. Strangerhood Studios was created when the Independent Film Channel asked Rooster Teeth Productions and machinima artist Paul Marino to create six shorts for television broadcast.

Only Sam, Dutchmiller, and Catherine from the original cast have recurring roles. Wade is seen in a potential promotional poster as the "funny sidekick"; he also appears in another poster for a romance-themed pitch, along with Tovar. Nikki is mentioned in a phone conversation. Starting from episode 4, every Strangerhood character, except for Tovar, appear in the mini-series.

== Characters ==
As with Red vs. Blue, The Strangerhood features a cast of diverse characters, each skewed in different ways and to varying degrees. Their natures are summed up by the Omnipotent Voice in episode 2 when it booms "Silence, assorted stereotypes!". There are nine main characters, and a small number of supporting characters.

Sam is the straight man of the series, often serious in comparison to the other residents; he often describes the situations the residents find themselves in as being ridiculous. Wade, Sam's housemate, is a stereotypical stoner, with bloodshot eyes and memory problems, and is frequently confused by events. Dr Chalmers is an elderly, curmudgeonly intellectual, frequently irritated by his fellow residents. Tovar is a confused ethnic minority, with a silly accent and a penchant for doing foolish things. Dutchmiller is a yuppie stereotype, enthusiastic about everything alternative. Catherine is a stereotypical dumb blonde, who uses other people to her own ends. Nikki is a teenager who is curious as to what is actually going on. Griggs is a stereotypical "tough guy" with camouflage facepaint and a highly aggressive attitude, and is Nikki's biological father in the present time.

=== Supporting characters ===
- The Omnipotent Voice: A mysterious voice that can project itself through various devices and objects such as computers and newspapers and who orders the residents about.
- Evil Tovar/Tobar: Tovar's evil twin, created by accident. He is "pure evil" while the other Tovar is "pure moron."
- The Garden Gnome: A garden gnome that follows Griggs around and talks to him in an unintelligible language.
- Sam: A man who lives in isolation underground throughout the series and is the real Omnipotent Voice. Strangerhood Sam stole his name along with his labeled underwear.

=== Other characters ===
- In Episode Six "Idol Desperation", Sam calls a number of characters on the telephone to tell them about Nikki. At first, it is the main characters, then moving onto other characters from the sim world, such as the Grim Reaper, the Social Bunny, and some objects such as the gnome and the pink flamingo.

== Episodes ==
=== Series overview ===
Season	Episodes	Originally released	
Season	Episodes	First released	Last released
1	17	October 18, 2004	April 27, 2006
Specials	3	December 23, 2004	October 29, 2005
Studios	6	July 12, 2005	October 12, 2005
2	4	September 30, 2015	October 3, 2015

=== Season 1 (2004–2006) ===
No. overall	No. in season	Title	Directed by	Written by	Original release date
1	1	"Why Are You Here?"	Burnie Burns & Matt Hullum	Burnie Burns & Matt Hullum	October 18, 2004
A man awakens in a bed next to a stoner. After questioning the stoner without result, he is asked his name. To which the man responds he has no idea. A man with camo-paint on his face is seen walking through his kitchen. He makes his breakfast and sits down to eat. While eating he realizes that he is not in his own house, then apathetically keeps eating. An old black man sits at his couch contemplating who he is and why he is in a house that is not his. A business man walks along a house greeting everything from the mailbox to the living room. Catherine compliments herself in front of a mirror. A foreign man with a mustache is contemplating what he forgot to do as we see the stove catching fire behind him (he remembers that it is garbage day). A young girl shouts for someone wondering where she is and why she is talking to herself. The man and the stoner get together and contemplate their names. The man believes his name is Sam, since it is written all over his underwear. The stoner believes his name is Durnt. Sam points out the stoner's name tag says "My name is Wade" but Wade still swears his name is Durnt. The old black man strolls up to them. He quickly becomes frustrated with Sam and Wade and walks away. Sam calls out to him believing they should stick together.
2	2	"The One With The Premise"	Burnie Burns & Matt Hullum	Burnie Burns & Matt Hullum	November 10, 2004
Each person, except Sam and Wade, finds notes telling him or her to go to the house that Wade and Sam are inhabiting. They are all vaguely informed about their situation by The Omnipotent Voice, who also tells them that cookies and Tang are forbidden and that someone in the room will die at the end of the transmission. A studio audience shows up partway through the episode, though they remain off-screen the entire time. This episode establishes Catherine's crush on Dutchmiller when he walks into the room, and reveals that Tovar burnt off his house and his moustache. As the transmission ends and the screen goes black (replaced with an outside shot of the house on the DVD version), two thumps are heard before an explosion, before Wade says "Oh, man! I hope that wasn't me that just died!", much to the studio audience's massive amusement.
3	3	"We Have a Floater"	Burnie Burns & Matt Hullum	Burnie Burns & Matt Hullum	December 2, 2004
To replace the recently deceased goldfish, the house gets a new goldfish in addition to the ones remaining in the tank. It is also revealed that Wade was only knocked unconscious in the otherwise harmless explosion, and is left feeling dazed as a result. Griggs almost manages to get rid of the studio audience by insulting them, but regrets it and starts to take it back by saying that the Voice itself is worse than them. Catherine leaves with Dutchmiller to ask him out on a date. Sam names the new fish, but Tovar objects, saying that it is an insult to humans and goldfish to give them a name. Chalmers agrees with Sam, but only because he thought that they needed names to indicate which one they wanted to eat in case of an emergency, since they cannot say, "I want to eat Anonymous." To avoid the possibility of Chalmers eating the fish, Sam develops an aversion to fish and refuses to eat fish. Chalmers says "He can't watch you forever... Anonymous."
4	4	"Sublimination Round"	Burnie Burns & Matt Hullum	Burnie Burns & Matt Hullum	February 5, 2005
The group receive a vmail from The Omnipotent Voice, who orders Sam, Wade, and Tovar to compete against Catherine, Dr. Chalmers, and Dutchmiller in a contest to cook and eat grilled cheese sandwiches. Unaware of the names of the second team's members, the voice just calls them "Gold Digger", "Curmudgeon", and "Weirdo", respectively. Both teams lose: the first team's oven catches fire, and the second team has dietary restrictions or preferences that prevent them from eating cheese (in a scene deleted from the DVD version, Wade suggests cooking something easier for the next challenge; and Catherine questions his choice of Baked Alaska). Griggs becomes separated from the others and is stalked by a mysterious gnome or leprechaun. When he finally confronts the stalker, he is told to do something that may shock the others and sever their ties with him, which he reluctantly agrees to.
5	5	"Things Misremembered"	Burnie Burns & Matt Hullum	Burnie Burns & Matt Hullum	March 31, 2005
Sam and Dr. Chalmers briefly discuss the idea of coming together to figure out what is going on. Wade and Tovar report to Sam and Dr. Chalmers that Nikki was murdered while they were swimming in the pool. They recall various reasons for Nikki's death — such as electrocution, drowning in the pool, and drowning in the cement — until they remember that had not actually seen it: They had been playing Marco Polo, and both had their eyes closed. Sam then tells Wade and Tovar that only one person at a time is supposed to close their eyes in the game. Tovar proceeds to blame Godzilla for Nikki's demise.
6	6	"Idol Desperation"	Burnie Burns & Matt Hullum	Burnie Burns & Matt Hullum	April 26, 2005
The episode begins with a narrative introduction by Nikki's voice-over, in a parody of Desperate Housewives. Wade and The Omnipotent Voice seem to be the only ones aware of her voice. Sam, Wade, and Chalmers then call everyone else to tell the news of Nikki's death. Wade "remembers" an incident in which he was performing in an American Idol parody, with Sam as Simon Cowell, Nikki as Paula Abdul, Chalmers as Randy Jackson, and Dutchmiller as Ryan Seacrest. Wade lost to the "fat guy". Sam affirms that it never happened, but Chalmers walks in and talks in the same style as he did in the flashback, implying that Wade's story is true. A worried Catherine arrives at Dutchmiller's house to discuss one of her personal secrets. The episode ends with a cliffhanger, while Nikki realises that she does not even know what she's talking about.
7	7	"Star-Crossed Suckers"	Burnie Burns & Matt Hullum	Burnie Burns & Matt Hullum	October 21, 2005
Sam looks through his telescope and notices that the constellations are incorrect. He explains this to Wade; he first shows him the Big Dipper, but also other non-existent constellations such as one shaped like a plumbob (the crystal that appears above active sims in the game). There is another one shaped like a "laser dog", spoofing the one in the Strangerhood Studios shorts. Meanwhile, in Dutchmiller's house, Catherine claims that she and Dutch had been married in their previous lives, before they were all gathered in Strangerhood Lane. Her behavior in Episodes 2 and 3 suggests that this might not be true, but that she has an eye for Dutch and will do and say almost anything to get what she wants out of him. She argues that she had the tiara to remind her, but the tiara fails to remind Dutch of anything. The episode ends with the two having a "WooHoo".
8	8	"WSI"	Burnie Burns & Matt Hullum	Burnie Burns & Matt Hullum	November 15, 2005
Sam and Dr. Chalmers speculate where Strangerhood Lane is located. For unfounded reasons, Dr. Chalmers believes that they are in Cleveland, Ohio. Wade appears wearing a police officer's uniform, saying that this is a sign that he should solve crimes. Dr. Chalmers believes that this is a good idea, while Sam does not. Wade offers Sam the position of sidekick; Chalmers and Wade discuss why Sam "fits the profile". Sam retorts that, if anyone should be the sidekick, it should be Wade. Wade disagrees, saying "Would a sidekick have his own opening credits montage?!" The opening credits for WSI: Wade Scene Investigation: Cleveland begin, obviously spoofing CSI: Crime Scene Investigation in the process. Wade asks Sam and Chalmers to commit some crimes so that he can solve them. Sam refuses to play the game, claiming that he had been cheated last time because Chalmers had said that jaywalking was not a crime. The group walks away as Chalmers rattles off the different crimes that he is going to commit. Griggs enters behind them and begins to ramble that the group never asks them to play their "felony game" and that he will get a high score at "nerd punching" to make them jealous.
9	9	"Detective Defective"	Burnie Burns & Matt Hullum	Burnie Burns & Matt Hullum	December 1, 2005
Wade gains the ability to do a narration voice-over without moving his lips. As Wade begins talking with himself in this manner, the scenery turns black and white, and remains that way for the duration of the episode. Wade sets to work, trying to find clues to solve Nikki's death. This results in run-ins with Sam, Tovar and Chalmers, all of whom object to Wade's arrogant voice-over comments about them. The episode ends with the implication that Griggs murdered Nikki, though Wade assumes it to be the work of an unidentified woman (and in a scene deleted from the DVD version, he speculates that it could be an inside job by the Mafia, despite Sam's objections that there is no Mafia in the Strangerhood).
10	10	"Devil May Care"	Burnie Burns & Matt Hullum	Burnie Burns & Matt Hullum	January 19, 2006
The episode begins with a suggestion that the garden gnome(s) may have framed Griggs, or directed him to murder Nikki and then erased his memory. It is also suggested that the gnome or gnomes have written a letter in his name, though his name on the note that Chalmers receives is misspelled. The note claims that Griggs was "involved", but not that he was actually the murderer. As Griggs realizes that he is a wanted man, he gets into a car that he finds. But, first, he stops to consider his options, unaware that a garden gnome is in the seat next to his. As Griggs struggles to make a decision, a devil version of himself appears on his right shoulder and tempts him to simply punch anyone who threatens him. An angel version of himself appears on his left shoulder and suggests that he "give flowers to everyone". The devil and angel versions of himself are both ill-tempered, and quickly begin to fight. Wade's angel appears on an objecting Griggs' shoulder, claiming that Wade is "too busy with his hobbies" to listen. Chalmers' angel then appears, claiming he was exiled from Chalmers for suggesting that the latter abandon his fetish for stealing refrigerators. The angels of Dutchmiller and Tovar then appear, believing that the whole thing is just a party; Sam's angel appears at first to scold everyone about the neighborhood code, but later agrees to party with the rest of them. Griggs sits still nervously, waiting for the devil and angels to finish so that he can make a logical decision. (In the DVD version, Officer Wade shows up nearby to arrest Griggs.)
11	11	"Cell Block Duh"	Burnie Burns & Matt Hullum	Burnie Burns & Matt Hullum	February 2, 2006
The episode opens with Griggs in a prison cell (revealed in the DVD to be in Griggs' house). He is soon visited by Tovar, and eventually Dutchmiller, acting as Tovar's lawyer. Tovar watches as Dutchmiller eventually leaves to chase an ambulance. Griggs tries to show Tovar a blueprint for the prison he had tattooed on his body so he can escape, but it turns out that Wade had instead tattooed a cat riding a surfboard. Griggs insists that it is a conspiracy that the others are all in on; Tovar dismisses this, claiming that it must be a simple explanation for everything. The episode ends with the Omnipotent Voice and a Leprechaun in a room; The voice announces the next phases of its plan.
12	12	"Surprise Guest"	Burnie Burns & Matt Hullum	Burnie Burns & Matt Hullum	February 14, 2006
This episode is set entirely within a parody of the Late Night show, with Dutchmiller as the host. Sam appears as a token audience member, Tovar as a comedian, Wade and Griggs playing chess, and Dr. Chalmers as a guest on the show. There are not many revelations within this, aside from the fact that Catherine, on her comeback appearance since Episode 7, walks in and informs Dutchmiller that she is pregnant. She tells him not to let anyone find out, but he proceeds to play a clip of their encounter that he has kept live on the show, much to Catherine's shock. Unable to trust Dutch any longer, she breaks up with him.
13	13	"Double Indumbnity"	Burnie Burns & Matt Hullum	Burnie Burns & Matt Hullum	March 2, 2006
This episode is set entirely in a courtroom parodying the long-running TV drama Law & Order with the episode opening with the title "Lies & Disorder." Tovar is revealed to be a compulsive liar; blaming Sam for Nikki's murder, even though Sam and Catherine are the jury. The two make a bet on the guilty verdict, with Sam believing that Griggs is innocent (the DVD version shows them playing poker to raise the stakes). However, Griggs is acquitted after Nikki makes her surprise comeback entrance since Episode 5, revealing that she was not really dead after all, leading to Sam winning the bet.
14	14	"Nikki's Alias"	Burnie Burns & Matt Hullum	Burnie Burns & Matt Hullum	March 16, 2006
This episode is also set in the courtroom from Episode 13. Nikki tells the others about what happened to her in flashback, in a spoof on the show Alias. She claims to have seen Tovar acting strangely, and that there she saw two of them; a moustached Tovar insulting the non-moustached Tovar. She followed the moustached Tovar around, changing disguises at each new location, until she found a strange room. She says that it is a secret room full of secret files, but she is cut off by Wade's wild theorizing. She then starts to say something about Griggs, but Wade cuts her off again.
15	15	"Lost In Place"	Burnie Burns & Matt Hullum	Burnie Burns & Matt Hullum	March 31, 2006
This episode starts off again in the court room and Nikki finally gets to describe what really happened. She first mentions that Griggs is her father. She then explains that she tried to race back home but was then knocked unconscious, explaining why everyone thought she was dead. When she awoke, she could not remember anything. Whilst everyone thought she was dead, she used the time to find more clues. Whilst looking for clues, she finds out something more shocking. Just as she is about to announce the news, she is suddenly interrupted by a parody of the title sequence from Lost, with the word Lost replaced by "STRANGERHOOD". She then announces that Catherine is a spy and that she knows exactly what is happening. Catherine's tiara is actually an antenna, that she uses to control the gnome. The gnome used an experimental mind-control ray to talk to Griggs. Catherine and the Gnome also set up Griggs to make it appear he killed Nikki. Catherine then runs off, shouting that she will not the others take her baby, much to everyone's shock, including Dutchmiller, who is concerned for the baby's health and safety. Nikki tries to explain what happens in more detail but is again cut off by the Lost title parody. Nikki takes the group to the secret room. Then the eyes of an old man appear. He has been watching the group from his lab. He asks himself where the group have gotten to and realises they are behind him. He explains to them that by entering the lab, they have sent off a chain reaction that threatens to release the most terrifying event the world has ever seen. He gets cuts off by the final Lost title parody. The episode ends with Wade (in voice over) asking if the man will finish off the sentence (omitted from the DVD version).
16	16	"The Montage Exposition"	Burnie Burns & Matt Hullum	Burnie Burns & Matt Hullum	April 11, 2006
After scolding the mysterious man for being overly dramatic about the possibility of getting fired, the characters begin to question him. He reveals his name is Sam and that the Sam we know has been wearing the underwear of Elder Sam and that he has had to go commando for the last three months. Griggs quickly misunderstands the meaning of "going commando". Elder Sam reveals that nobody has actually guessed their correct name, with the exception of Nikki. He explains that 100 years ago the entertainment industry ran out of ideas. To compensate they kidnapped people from the past, when they were watching good television, erased their memories and isolated them for observation. They believed they might have been able to create a new type of entertainment program, based on their actions and conversations. Sam asks about a reality show, to which Elder Sam believes Sam could be a writer or a studio executive for. It was believed that the isolation would make their ideas fresh and original. Dutchmiller asks if it worked, it did not. Griggs asks about the "weird stuff that happened". Elder Sam reveals himself to be the one behind the omnipotent voice and that Catherine was planted to "jazz things up". The characters demand to be sent back to their own time. Elder Sam agrees and boots up the time machine, featuring a parody of The Sims 2 loading screen. Just as the time machine is ready, Tovar's evil twin Tobar arrives with Catherine to stop them. (In a scene deleted from the DVD version, Dutchmiller compliments Elder Sam's use of the omnipotent voice, and Elder Sam plays a voicemail greeting he recorded in the voice.)
17	17	"The Final Countdown"	Burnie Burns & Matt Hullum	Burnie Burns & Matt Hullum	April 27, 2006
Elder Sam explains that Tobar is Tovar's evil twin that was accidentally created when Tovar was split into two in the time machine. Tobar reveals that he is holding Catherine as a hostage, and announces that he will burn down the building and kill everyone if he is not released to his own time. He initially gives everyone 24 hours to make their decision, but soon drops it to 24 minutes and then 24 seconds. While this is happening, a timer counts down, and multiple camera shots are shown in a similar fashion to the television series 24. Despite the risk of space-time imploding, Elder Sam agrees to send Tobar back at the last moment, to Wall Street, 1929, the year the stock market crashed. A computer terminal shows that the risked implosion is averted. Elder Sam then sends each character back to their respective times. Dutchmiller decides to stay behind with Catherine, which touches her so much that she decides to forgive him and they get back together. When Sam notes that regular Tovar is not being sent back, he is told that regular Tovar is "a time-space anomaly." and that the others will "probably liquify his DNA and drink it." Elder Sam comments that "genetic cannibalism" is acceptable in the future. However, once Sam is sent back, all the remaining characters decide to go play video games, realizing they have no ideas for new shows and movies due to the failure of the project. Sam wakes up on his couch in his apartment, thinking that his experiences were merely a dream, though he is still unsure. A montage is shown, explaining the fates of each character.

=== Specials (2004–2005) ===
No. overall	No. in season	Title	Directed by	Written by	Original release date
1	1	"The Seasons Greetings from The Strangerhood"	Burnie Burns & Matt Hullum	Burnie Burns & Matt Hullum	December 23, 2004
Although the eight residents have lost their memories and are unaware of the date, The Omnipotent Voice tells them in this episode that it is the holiday season, and orders them to celebrate the twenty days of Christmanukkah, combining the twelve days of Christmas with the eight of Hanukkah. Most of the residents like the idea, but Sam finds it to be one of the most ridiculous holidays ever.
2	2	"Bye Nikki Bye"	Burnie Burns & Matt Hullum	Burnie Burns & Matt Hullum	April 12, 2005
A music video commemorating Nikki's short time in the series. The song is played presumably by the "House Band," which includes Sam on guitar, Dr. Chalmers on drums, and Tovar on bass.
3	3	"'Halloween Tips, Tricks and Treats from The Strangerhood"	Burnie Burns & Matt Hullum	Burnie Burns & Matt Hullum	October 29, 2005
The residents offer costume suggestions and trick-or-treating tips.

=== Strangerhood Studios (2005) ===
No. overall	No. in season	Title	Directed by	Written by	Original release date
1	1	"The Pitch 1" "The Pitch"	Burnie Burns & Matt Hullum	Burnie Burns & Matt Hullum	July 12, 2005
The network studios pitch in to Sam's idea about a new motion picture. He wishes to work independently, but Dutchmiller and Catherine push their own ideas for the film. Sam wants his series to be "gritty" and "urban", while Dutchmiller and Catherine want a "funny sidekick" or a "romantic interest". Sam becomes enraged when Dutch and Catherine try to take control, shouting, "Son of a bitch!" (a Red vs. Blue reference), which soon becomes a working title.
2	2	"The Pitch 2" "Statistically Speaking"	Burnie Burns & Matt Hullum	Burnie Burns & Matt Hullum	July 12, 2005
The good news is that the pitch is highly anticipated by the studio. The catch is that no one in the focus group likes the characters or the story. Sam considers this and decides to change a few things; however, Dutchmiller and Catherine advise him to come up with an entirely new story. Eventually, they draft a script concerning a cyborg altar boy from the future and starring a time-traveling narrator.
3	3	"The Pitch 3" "Punk 'Til I Puke"	Burnie Burns & Matt Hullum	Burnie Burns & Matt Hullum	August 1, 2005
The production crew finally makes a movie about punk rock. Sam, Dutchmiller, and Catherine argue over marketing techniques and stunts to use at the movie premiere. Dutchmiller and Catherine suggest getting tattoos and burning bras. Sam objects — in vain, as usual.
4	4	"The Pitch 4" "Reality Check"	Burnie Burns & Matt Hullum	Burnie Burns & Matt Hullum	August 15, 2005
The episode begins with a documentary style of shooting. Sam meets the focus group; they begin to make clichéd objections to his film. Chalmers rants, for a variety of reasons, about the forms they were forced to complete. Dutchmiller and Catherine announce that Sam will star in a reality show in which he will live with the focus group for the next six months. Sam is incredulous as the commercial for Unfocused for C3 (Corporate Cinema Channel) rolls, featuring various review quotes that appear to have been taken out of context.
5	5	"The Pitch 5" "Reinventing the Wagon Wheel"	Burnie Burns & Matt Hullum	Burnie Burns & Matt Hullum	September 7, 2005
Dutchmiller and Catherine inform Sam that the focus group still is unhappy with the latest version of his film, a cowboy western called The Old Wagon. They believe that it still needs "a little tweaking". The group offers suggestions for various anachronistic elements, such as lasers and spaceships. The episode ends with a poster for The Old Lazer Spaceship.
6	6	"The Pitch 6" "Exception Speech"	Burnie Burns & Matt Hullum	Burnie Burns & Matt Hullum	October 12, 2005
Sam finally takes a stand and argues that the focus group is unqualified to judge his movies. Wade says that he usually classifies the summer blockbusters he sees by the intensity of his "Whoa!"; Catherine insists that the focus group is chosen through a lengthy "screening process". Chalmers and Wade (especially Wade) attempt to opt out of the "screening process", but have already consented to it. Sam yells that he cannot be a part of such a travesty of filmmaking; the group insists that if by "travesty" he means sacks of money and worldwide fame, then he is exactly right. Sam pauses for a moment and then demands his own parking space, to which Dutchmiller agrees. The episode then cuts to The 75th Semi-Monthly Golden Cyborg Awards and Celebrity Bakeoff, where a scene from the film is shown. The winner for Best Picture is Punk Cyborg Lazer Dog Spaceship Cat Wagon: The Movie. Sam nervously accepts the award as everyone else cheers him on. The mini-series ends with a newspaper headline about the ceremony and Sam's movie.

=== Season 2 (2015) ===
No. overall	No. in season	Title	Directed by	Written by	Original release date
18	1	"Operation: No More Strangerhood"	Kyle Taylor & Josh Ornelas	Gray Haddock & Kerry Shawcross	September 29, 2015
19	2	"The One With The Plot"	Kyle Taylor & Josh Ornelas	Gray Haddock & Kerry Shawcross	September 30, 2015
20	3	"A Ray of Hope"	Kyle Taylor & Josh Ornelas	Gray Haddock & Kerry Shawcross	October 1, 2015
21	4	"Dreams Do Come True"	Kyle Taylor & Josh Ornelas	Gray Haddock & Kerry Shawcross	October 2, 2015

== Production ==
Animation for The Strangerhood is recorded on three separate computers. Owing to the limitations of the simulation engine, it was necessary to create a number of clones of each character, each with a different expression — happy, sad, angry, and so forth. The unused versions are herded into an out-of-viewpoint room and exchanged as necessary to obtain the various facial expressions. Lines are used that best match the mouth movements and gestures of the characters.

"If we need them to kiss for a scene," explains Burns, "we have to develop their relationship until they're attracted to each other."

In June 2014, it was announced that a second season would be produced if the Indiegogo funds for the Rooster Teeth film Lazer Team surpassed US$2.25 million. This goal was reached during RTX on 5 July 2014, and a second season was published at the end of September 2015.

== Distribution ==
Videos are released in QuickTime (QT), DivX, and Windows Media Video (WMV) formats. All released episodes of the season in production are freely available from the official site, in 360-by-240 resolution.
