= 1996 in machinima =

The following is a list of notable machinima-related events in the year 1996. These include the release of id Software's first-person shooter computer game Quake. This game was used to create the first machinima works later that year.

== Events ==
- May 31 – id Software released Quake.

== Notable machinima releases ==
- October 26 – United Ranger Films released the first known machinima production, Diary of a Camper.
- October 31 – United Ranger Films released Ranger Gone Bad.
- November 6 – United Ranger Films released Torn Apart, a short horror film that used custom "RangerCam" technology.
- December 2 – United Ranger Films released Ranger Gone Bad 2: Assault on Gloom Keep.
- December 13 – United Ranger Films released Torn Apart 2: Ranger Down!, the first machinima work to feature voices.
