= Rocket jumping =

Explosive self propulsion tactic in video games

A rocket jump maneuver: the player fires a rocket at the ground while jumping, to increase the height of their jump

In shooter video games, rocket jumping (also known as blast jumping or explosive jumping) is a technique of using the knockback of an explosive weapon, most often a rocket launcher, to launch the shooter into the air. The aim of this technique is to reach heights, distances and speed that standard character movement cannot achieve. Although the origin of rocket jumping is unclear, its usage was popularized by Quake and Team Fortress 2.

Rocket jumping is used often in competitive play, where it can allow the player to gain quick bursts of speed, reach normally unobtainable heights, secure positional advantages, or in speedrunning. However, a potential consequence of rocket jumping is that it can injure the player character, either from the blast or from fall damage. This effect makes the technique less useful in games where the damage from the blast and/or fall is high, or where health is difficult to replenish.

== In the Quake series ==
While using explosives to propel oneself was first seen in Doom, the modern technique became a core mechanic in Quake. By exploiting the physics of the Quake engine, many advanced movement techniques were spawned such as circle jumping, strafing, bunny hopping, and explosive jumping. Rocket jumping was kept as an intentional mechanic for the following games in the Quake series. In Quake III Arena some of the computer-controlled opponents use rocket jumps.

== Forms ==
Rocket jumping has appeared in several games in a variety of forms, sometimes as a form of emergent gameplay.

=== Horizontal ===
A horizontal form of rocket jumping appears in Doom (1993), where it is used to reach the secret exit in E3M6.

=== Vertical ===
The first games to feature vertical rocket jumping were Bungie's Marathon and 3D Realms' Rise of the Triad, which were both released on the same day. It was featured the same year on The Outfoxies. Rocket jumping became very popular in the original Quake (1996), and was used as an advanced technique for deathmatch play as well as for the Quake done Quick series.

In the game Team Fortress 2 (2007), the Soldier class can use his rockets to rocket jump. This is an intentional feature with several mechanics associated with it. The game features numerous unlockable weapons with attributes that only affect rocket jumping or only apply while rocket jumping. The Demoman class can achieve a similar effect using his own assortment of explosive weapons, such as the stickybomb launcher, or by crouching and jumping with his Ullapool Caber melee weapon. It is also possible to use knockback provided by enemy explosives to perform a similarly boosted jump as any class.

In Minecraft (2011), the player can activate TNT in order to propel themselves. While it is usually fatal when attempted, equipping armour can allow players to survive the blast damage, enabling it to be used as a form of transportation. It can also be attempted with creepers, in-game entities that explode upon one being close for a certain period of time. The Breeze ball could also be classified as a form of rocket jump, as it uses the same mechanics, although the player sustains no damage.

In Overwatch (2016), multiple characters have explosive projectiles that can be used to rocket jump.

=== Other variations ===
- A similar technique can often be performed with other explosives, such as grenades, remotely detonated bombs or explosive objects in the level; depending on the game, these might be more, equally or less viable alternatives to rocket jumps.
- Some games offer weapons that knock the user back with their recoil. In the Unreal series of games, in addition to traditional rocket jumps, the weapons can be charged up for a powerful melee attack that can be aimed at the ground to boost the player. In Half-Life (1998), the Tau Cannon can be charged for a stronger attack that pushes the user back; in the multiplayer mode of the game, the weapon charges up faster, and the knockback is increased to a point where it can also be directed vertically, allowing players to use this as a form of mobility. In the Halo game franchise, players often use guns such as the Concussion rifle or Frag grenades to launch the player faster or higher for speedrunning purposes, or to reach normally unreachable areas or easter eggs.
- In Angry Birds, there is a white bird named Matilda who can deploy exploding eggs from her rear. When the egg is deployed, Matilda is thrown higher. This can be used to destroy higher structures, which is usually difficult due to the bird's weight. However, the jump does not rely on the blast, but the technique is somewhat related to rocket jumping.
- In Fortnite Battle Royale it is possible to ride launched missiles to reach other places that are time-consuming, difficult or impossible to access on foot. This technique, called rocket riding, does not rely on the force of a rocket explosion as in typical rocket jumping, but can be seen to be related to it in that it inherits the same risks.

== Reception ==
As a result of rocket jumping being discovered and later implemented into various games, it has been praised for the unique layer of strategy it adds to games that include it. It can be linked to the rise in demand and delivery of movement-based shooter games during the 2010s-20s. While some of these games do not implement rocket jumping directly, they have been similarly praised for their innovation in movement-based gameplay and themselves spawned a demand for more movement-based shooters.

== Outside video games ==
Rocket jumping has appeared in other media as well.

- In the live-action film Transformers, the character Ironhide performs a rocket jump over a screaming woman after transforming from his truck mode.
- In the film Planet Terror, lead character Cherry Darling uses her peg leg, a machine gun with underslung grenade launcher, to rocket jump over a tall wall.
- In the film Tokyo Gore Police, lead character Ruka uses a bazooka to rocket jump to a building's rooftop.
- In Freddie Wong's and Brandon Laatsch's video "The Rocket Jump", the rocket jump is featured as the main part of the YouTube short. This later influenced their channel and studio into being renamed "RocketJump".
- In the episode "The Librarians and the Point of Salvation" of the second season of the TV series The Librarians, rocket jumping is specifically referred to but done using grenades.
