= Digital puppetry =

Real-time manipulation of digitally animated figures

Digital puppetry is the manipulation and performance of digitally animated 2D or 3D figures and objects in a virtual environment that are rendered in real-time by computers. It is most commonly used in filmmaking and television production but has also been used in interactive theme park attractions and live theatre.

The exact definition of what is and is not digital puppetry is subject to debate among puppeteers and computer graphics designers, but it is generally agreed that digital puppetry differs from conventional computer animation in that it involves performing characters in real-time, rather than animating them frame by frame.

Digital puppetry is closely associated with character animation, motion capture technologies, and 3D animation, as well as skeletal animation. Digital puppetry is also known as virtual puppetry, performance animation, real-time animation (although the latter also refers to animation generated by computer game engines). Machinima is another form of digital puppetry, and prominent Machinima creators have often identified themselves as puppeteers.

== History and usage ==
=== Early analogue experiments ===
One of the earliest pioneers of digital puppetry was Lee Harrison III. He conducted experiments in the early 1960s that animated figures using analog circuits and a cathode ray tube. Harrison rigged up a body suit with potentiometers and created the first working motion capture rig, animating 3D figures in real-time on his CRT screen. He made several short films with this system, which he called ANIMAC. Among the earliest examples of puppets produced with the system included a character called "Mr. Computer Image" who was controlled by a combination of the ANIMAC's body control rig and an early form of voice-controlled automatic lip sync.

=== Mike Normal ===
The first digital 3D character performed live in real-time for an audience was Mike the Talking Head, which Brad DeGraf and partner Michael Wahrman developed to show off the real-time capabilities of Silicon Graphics' then-new 4D series workstations. Unveiled at the 1988 SIGGRAPH convention, it was the first live performance of a digital character. Mike was a sophisticated talking head driven by a specially built controller that allowed a single puppeteer to control many parameters of the character's face, including mouth, eyes, expression, and head position.

The system developed by deGraf/Wahrman to perform Mike Normal was later used to create a representation of the villain Cain in the motion picture RoboCop 2, which is believed to be the first example of digital puppetry being used to create a character in a full-length motion picture.

=== Waldo C. Graphic ===
The first real-time digital 3D puppet used commercially in a broadcast television series and a major theme park attraction was Waldo C. Graphic, a character originally created in 1988 by Jim Henson and Pacific Data Images for the Muppet television series The Jim Henson Hour. Henson had used the Scanimate system to generate a digital version of his Nobody character in real-time for the television series Sesame Street as early as 1970 and Waldo grew out of experiments Henson conducted to create a computer generated version of his character Kermit the Frog in 1985.

Waldo's strength as a computer-generated puppet was that he could be controlled by a single puppeteer (Steve Whitmire) in real-time in concert with conventional puppets. The computer image of Waldo was mixed with the video feed of the camera focused on physical puppets so that all of the puppeteers in a scene could perform together. (It was already standard Muppeteering practice to use monitors while performing, so the use of a virtual puppet did not significantly increase the complexity of the system.) Afterward, in post-production, PDI re-rendered Waldo in full resolution, adding a few dynamic elements on top of the performed motion.

Waldo C. Graphic was featured prominently in Muppet*Vision 3D at Disney's Hollywood Studios in Lake Buena Vista, Florida, which operated from 1996–2025, and at Disney California Adventure in Anaheim, California, which operated from 2001–2014.

=== Sesame Street: "Elmo's World" ===
One of the most widely seen successful examples of digital puppetry in a TV series is Sesame Street's "Elmo's World" segment. A set of furniture characters were created with CGI, to perform simultaneously with Elmo and other real puppets. They were performed in real-time on set, simultaneously with live puppet performances. As with the example of Henson's Waldo C. Graphic above, the digital puppets' video feed was seen live by both the digital and physical puppet performers, allowing the digital and physical characters to interact.

=== Machinima ===
The late 1990s and early 2000s saw the democratization of real-time virtual performance through Machinima, which grew out of the demoscene of the 1980s. Rather than use expensive, proprietary systems, Machinima creators utilized 3D video game engines and consumer hardware (such as keyboards, mice, and game controllers) to manipulate in-game avatars as digital puppets, establishing an ultra low-cost alternative to traditional forms of animation.

One of the earliest popular examples of using recorded gameplay to tell a story was Diary of a Camper (1996). A few years later Machinima would achieve broader pop culture success with series like Red vs. Blue (2003), which used the Halo video game engine, and was famously described by one prominent critic as "truly as sophisticated as Samuel Beckett". More recently, Machinima has been used by filmmakers to produce animated documentaries such as Grand Theft Hamlet (2024), which have been screened to critical acclaim at major film festivals and received numerous awards.

=== Disney theme parks ===
Walt Disney Imagineering has also been an important innovator in the field of digital puppetry, developing new technologies to enable visitors to Disney theme parks to interact with some of the company's famous animated characters. In 2004, they used digital puppetry techniques to create the Turtle Talk with Crush attractions at Epcot and Disney California Adventure. In the attraction, a hidden puppeteer performs and voices a digital puppet of Crush, the laid-back sea turtle from Finding Nemo, on a large rear-projection screen. To the audience, Crush appears to be swimming inside an aquarium and engages in unscripted, real-time conversations with theme park guests.

Disney continued to use digital puppetry techniques to create attractions like Stitch Encounter (2006), and Monsters, Inc. Laugh Floor (2007). New developments in real-time animation technology, like markerless motion capture, have enabled the creation of Disney character attractions like the award-winning Real-Time Rocket, in which improv actors interacted with audience members as Rocket Raccoon from Marvel's Guardians of the Galaxy franchise at Disney's D23 Expo in 2024.

=== Military simulation and training ===
Since 2014, the United States Army's Program Executive Office for Simulation, Training, Research, and Instrumentation (PEO STRI), a division of US Army Simulation and Training Technology Center (STTC), has been experimenting with digital puppetry as a method of teaching advanced situational awareness for infantry squads. A single improvisor using motion capture technology from Organic Motion Inc interacted with squads through the medium of several different life-sized avatars of varying ages and genders that were projected onto multiple walls throughout an urban operations training facility. The motion capture technology was paired with real-time voice shifting to achieve the effect.

== Types of digital puppetry ==
=== Waldo puppetry ===
A digital puppet is controlled onscreen in real-time by a puppeteer who uses a telemetric input device known as a Waldo (after the short story "Waldo" by Robert A. Heinlein which features a man who invents and uses such devices), connected to the computer. The X-Y-Z axis movement of the input device causes the digital puppet to move correspondingly.

=== Motion capture puppetry/performance animation ===
An object (puppet) or human body is used as a physical representation of a digital puppet and manipulated by a puppeteer. The movements of the object or body are matched correspondingly by the digital puppet in real time. Motion capture puppetry is commonly used, for example, by VTubers, who rig digital avatars to correspond to the movements of their heads using readily available hardware like webcams and smartphones equipped with 3D depth cameras.
