= The Movies (video game) =

2005 video game

- Developer: Lionhead Studios
- Publishers: Activision; Sega; Feral Interactive (Mac)
- Designer: Adrian Moore
- Programmer: James Brown
- Artists: Joe Rider; Wilfried Ayel
- Writer: Martin Korda
- Composer: Daniel Pemberton
- Engine: RenderWare
- Platforms: Windows, Mac OS X
- Release: Windows: NA: 8 November 2005; EU: 11 November 2005; Mac OS X 20 December 2006
- Genre: Business simulation
- Modes: Single-player, multiplayer

The Movies is a business simulation game created by Lionhead Studios for Microsoft Windows and ported to Mac OS X by Feral Interactive. Players run a Hollywood film studio, creating films that can be exported from the game. The Movies was released in November 2005 to positive reviews and several awards, but sold poorly. An expansion, The Movies: Stunts & Effects, was released in 2006.

== Gameplay ==
The Movies allows players to run their own movie studio, including designing the studio itself and managing the careers of film stars. The game starts in the 1930s and continues into the future.

Players can create their own movies using in-game assets and at one time could upload them to the game's website The Movies Online.

== Development ==
The Movies was developed by Lionhead Studios, a studio created and led by the game's executive designer, Peter Molyneux. Lead designer Mark Webley recounted that the game had been suggested by Molyneux as early as December 2001, who then brainstormed a one-page concept for a film-themed management game one morning in January 2002. Development of The Movies commenced in February 2002, starting from a three-man team including Webley and Lionhead colleagues Adrian Moore as lead designer and James Brown as lead programmer. An early version of the game was ready to show to journalists at the European Computer Trade Show in September 2002.

The soundtrack for the game was composed by Daniel Pemberton.

== Release ==
=== Sales ===
The Movies was released in November 2005 and by the end of the year had sold above 50,000 copies in the United Kingdom, a number that Eurogamer's Kristan Reed called "relatively minor". The game ultimately received a "Silver" sales award from the Entertainment and Leisure Software Publishers Association (ELSPA), indicating sales of at least 100,000 copies in the region.

Peter Molyneux assessed the sales performance of the game as influenced by the rise of the console market, competition with other titles over the Christmas period, and the increasing number of casual gamers in the market.

=== Stunts and Effects ===
In June 2006, Lionhead studios released the expansion pack The Movies: Stunts & Effects. Feral Interactive ported the expansion to Mac OS in 2008. The expansion added stunts and stuntmen, new special effects, fewer camera placement restrictions, and expanded environments and clothing options.

== Reception ==
Reception

Aggregate score
Aggregator	Score
Metacritic	84/100

Review scores
Publication	Score
1Up.com	8/10
Computer Games Magazine	3.5/5
Computer Gaming World	4.5/5
Edge	7/10
GamePro	4/5
GameRevolution	B-
GameSpot	8.2/10
GameSpy	3.5/5
GameZone	9/10
IGN	8/10
PC Gamer (US)	86%
PALGN	8/10

Review aggregator Metacritic gave the PC version a score of 84 out of 100 ("Generally favorable reviews") based on 62 reviews from critics. The first review was published by GameSpy, which gave the game a 3.5 out of 5. Metacritic gave the expansion, The Movies: Stunts & Effects, a score of 78 out of 100 based on 37 reviews from critics.

Computer Games Magazine gave The Movies their 2005 "Best Utility" and "Best Original Music" awards. The game won the best simulation award at the 2006 BAFTA Video Games Awards

=== Accolades ===
The Movies received several accolades as the best simulation title of the year. The game received the "Simulation" award and was nominated for "Original Score" by the British Academy of Film and Television Arts at the 2006 3rd British Academy Games Awards. At the 9th Annual Interactive Achievement Awards held by the Academy of Interactive Arts & Sciences, The Movies received the "Simulation Game of the Year", along with nominations for "Outstanding Innovation in Gaming" and "Computer Game of the Year".

=== Retrospective reception ===
Several publications have retrospectively praised The Movies for its innovative design, whilst remarking that the game did not fully meet its ambitions. Edge describing the game as "arguably ahead of its time". In 2012, Hugh Milligan of IGN stated The Movies was a "daring experiment", highlighting the game's movie-making tools and online integration as facilitating an "astonishing level of creativity" and turning what he considered a "solid but unspectacular simulation game into an incredible social experience". In 2015, Graham Smith of Rock, Paper, Shotgun described the game as failing to deliver on its "interesting" concept, stating that its "creative suite is limited in terms of what you can make, and the management game splits your time between the fantasy of heading studio and the tedium of nannying people". In 2016, The Guardian called The Movies's online service "[p]erhaps the most forward-thinking feature" because it pre-dated YouTube by a year.

== Legacy ==
Using The Movies, Alex Chan, a French resident with no previous filmmaking experience, took four days to create The French Democracy, a short machinima political film about the 2005 civil unrest in France.

The 2024 game Blockbuster Inc. was marketed as a spiritual successor to The Movies.
