= Quake done Quick =

2009 Series of speedruns and machinima movies

- Genre: Video game walkthrough
- Original language: English
- No. of episodes: 7500+

Original release
- Network: Speed Demos Archive
- Release: 1997 – 2008
- Network: YouTube
- Release: 2009 – present

Related
- Quake,Speedrun

Quake done Quick is a series of collaborative speedruns and machinima movies in which the video game Quake, its mission packs, and related games are completed as quickly as possible without the use of cheats. Most playthroughs use shortcuts or tricks, such as bunny hopping and rocket jumping, in order to achieve a faster time. These movies are available in the game engine's native demo format and in various multimedia formats such as AVI.

== Formats ==
=== Collaborative speedruns ===
The speedruns featured in Quake done Quick are collaborative speedruns. Unlike traditional speedruns, in which a single player (or "runner") attempts to complete the entire game as quickly as possible, collaborative speedruns combine the work of multiple runners who each complete a specific part of the game. Breaking the speedrun into small pieces allows runners to focus their practice on a small portion of the game, which is why collaborative speedruns often feature faster times than traditional ones. For Quake done Quick, runners contribute to the speedrun by submitting demos of individual levels.

=== Machinima ===
Some of the speedruns have been turned into machinima movies. These productions feature custom skins, models, scripts, and "recams", which show the run from cinematic camera perspectives rather than the game's default first-person view. This is done for entertainment purposes, and there is always an unedited first-person perspective recording available as documentation of the runners' efforts.

== Popularity ==
The machinima movies of Quake done Quick are far more popular than the game's conventional speedruns. Some of them, most notably the movies that feature speedruns on the game's hardest difficulty level, have been distributed with gaming magazines and posted on news sites. After the creation of the Quake done Quick with a Vengeance movie, Slashdot featured the movie on its front page.

Of all the Quake done Quick speedruns, Quake done Quick with a Vengeance is the most popular. It features the entire game completed in 0:12:23 on “Nightmare” difficulty (the hardest difficulty level). This run succeeded Quake done Quicker and the original Quake done Quick movie, in which the game was completed in 0:16:35 and 0:19:49, respectively.

== Techniques ==
The Quake done Quick with a Vengeance speedrun is over four minutes faster than its predecessor. This feat surpassed the initial expectations of the runners and was largely made possible by the discovery of bunny hopping. This technique enabled runners to move much more quickly through levels and allowed them to save rockets and grenades for other tricks, since certain parts of the game could now be completed without them.

== Releases ==
This is a list of releases in the Quake done Quick series. (Note: Quake demos are usually stored in the Dzip compression algorithm, which was specially developed for these files by Nolan Pflug and Stefan Schwoon. It is available for free download at the Dzip Online Web site.) The most notable ones have been annotated. Unlike conventional speedrunning records, the individual players who worked on these runs are not listed since there are always many different players working on these projects. Instead, the records are usually attributed to the “Quake done Quick team”, and details on who made which portion of the run can be found in the runs' descriptions.

More details can be found on the official Quake done Quick website (see § External links).

Title	Acronym	Completion time	Date of publishing	Description
Quake
Quake done Quick	QdQ	0:19:49	1997-06-11	Run through Quake on Nightmare difficulty
Skillz Test #4 reel	ST4reel		1997-08-09	A highlight reel from the Skillz Test #4 challenge
Quake done Quicker	QdQr	0:16:35	1997-09-13	Run through Quake on Nightmare difficulty
Speed Beyond Belief	sBB	0:04:25	1997-12-20	Run through Beyond Belief on Easy difficulty ^{7}
Quake done Quick lite	QdQlite	0:12:54	1998-01-24	Run through Quake on Easy difficulty ^{3}
Scourge done Slick	SdS	0:11:02	1998-07-26	Run through Quake Mission Pack 1: Scourge of Armagon on Nightmare difficulty ^{5}
Scourge done Slick lite	SdSlite	0:08:20	1998-12-07	Run through Quake Mission Pack 1: Scourge of Armagon on Easy difficulty ^{6}
Fiend Run Lite	FRL	0:10:00	1999-04-01	Run through Quake on Easy difficulty “as a fiend”
Speed Completely Beyond Belief	SCBB	0:12:33, 0:18:24	1999-06-10	Run through Beyond Belief on Easy difficulty and Nightmare difficulty while obtaining 100% kills and secrets
Quake done 100% Quicker	Qd100Qr	0:59:31	2000-01-04	Run through Quake on Nightmare difficulty while obtaining 100% kills and secrets
Quake done double Quick	QddQ	0:12:35	2000-08-29	Run through Quake on Nightmare difficulty with two players at the same time
Runner's Delight at Speedcon	RDSC	0:03:29	2000-08-29	Run through Runner's Delight Easy difficulty with two players ^{7}
Quake done Quick with a Vengeance	QdQwav	0:12:23	2000-09-13	Run through Quake on Nightmare difficulty ^{2}
Blue Hell done Quick	BHdQ	0:00:38, 0:00:51	2000-11-30	Run through Blue Hell on Nightmare difficulty and Easy difficulty while obtaining 100% kills and secrets when playing on Easy ^{7}
Speed Beyond Belief lite II	SBBlite2	0:02:20	2002-03-02	Run through Beyond Belief on Easy difficulty
Quake done Backwards	QdB	0:11:28	2002-12-24	Run through Quake on Easy difficulty in reverse level order
The Rabbit Run	TRR	0:10:58	2003-09-18	Run through Quake on Easy difficulty
Quake done double Quick lite	QddQlite	0:09:55	2006-06-22	Run through Quake on Easy difficulty with two players at the same time
Quake done 100% Quick lite 2	Qd100Qlite2	0:33:33	2006-07-22	Run through Quake on Easy difficulty while obtaining 100% kills and secrets ^{4}
Quake done Quickest	QdQst	0:11:29	2011-12-29	Run through Quake on Nightmare difficulty ^{1}
Quake done 100% Quickest	Qd100Qst	0:48:00	2011-12-29	Run through Quake on Nightmare difficulty while obtaining 100% kills and secrets
Quake done 100% Quickest lite	Qd100Qstlite	0:29:20	2020-06-22	Run through Quake on Easy difficulty while obtaining 100% kills and secrets
Quake done Quickest Lite	QdQstlite	0:10:09	2022-12-22	Run through Quake on Easy difficulty
Quake done Quickest 2	QdQst2	0:10:20	2024-12-29	Run through Quake on Nightmare difficulty ^{10}
Quake II
Quake2 done Quick2	Q2dQ2	0:21:06	1999-07-05	Run through Quake II on Hard difficulty
Doom
Hell quickly Revealed	HqR	0:43:39	1997-11-21	Run through Hell Revealed on Ultra-Violence difficulty ^{9}
Doom2 done Quick	D2dQ2116	0:21:16	1998-06-10	Run through Doom II on Ultra-Violence difficulty
Doom done Quicker	DdQr	0:16:05	2000-12-10	Run through The Ultimate Doom on Ultra-Violence difficulty ^{8}

^{1} preceded by Quake done Quick With A Vengeance
^{2} preceded by Quake done Quicker and Quake done Quick
^{3} originally 0:14:06, but later improved to its current time
^{4} preceded by Quake done 100% Quick lite
^{5} the Quake done Quick website notes that this is currently their best movie
^{6} available as add-on to Scourge done Slick
^{7} this run is for an independently produced and freely available Quake map pack
^{8} preceded by Doom done Quick
^{9} this run is for an independently produced and freely available Doom map pack
^{10} preceded by original Quake done Quickest, released 13 years after original run

== See also ==
- List of video games notable for speedrunning
- Speed Demos Archive
