= Diary of a Camper =

1996 machinima animated short film

- A scene from Diary of a Camper; dialogue is presented as on-screen text messages.
- Engine: Quake
- Genre: Action
- Running time: 1 minute and 36 seconds
- Release(s): October 26, 1996
- Format: Quake demo recording

Diary of a Camper is an American short film released in October 1996 that was made using id Software's first-person shooter video game Quake. The film was created by the Rangers, a clan or group of video game players, and first released over the Internet as a non-interactive game demo file. The minute and a half-long video is commonly considered the first example of machinima—the art of using real-time, virtual 3D environments, often game engines, to create animated films. The story centers on five members of the Rangers clan fighting against a lone camper in a multiplayer deathmatch.

Machinima had its roots in the demoscene of the 1980s, helping to inspire the demo recording modes of the video games Doom and Quake. Although players had previously recorded segments of gameplay, these were usually deathmatches or speedruns. Diary of a Camper was the first demo to contain a narrative with text-based dialogue, instead of merely showing gameplay. Commentators have called Diary of a Camper primitive, but acknowledge its importance in establishing video games as a medium for filmmaking; the film inspired machinima filmmakers and spurred more complex machinima works in Quake and other games.

== Synopsis ==
Diary of a Camper is set on the Quake map "The Dark Zone", with dialogue displayed as text messages. First exploring some of the map, the Rangers next gather and send two members to scout a room above. After teleporting into the room, a camper lying in wait kills them both. The remaining three Rangers realize their comrades' fate and return fire from a distance, killing the camper. Examining the camper's remains, they identify their foe as John Romero, designer of Quake.

== Background ==
In the 1970s and 80s, demoscene developers showcased their talents creating demos—short introductory audiovisual presentations. The demoscene inspired id Software's John Carmack and his approach to game development. Id's 1993 computer game Doom featured a gameplay recording tool that produced its own demo files; these files contained information about character positions and game events, and could be played back by others using the Doom game engine. This enabled smaller file sizes than rendered video frames, and facilitated easy file sharing in an era of slow internet speeds. Doom's successor, Quake, included new multiplayer gameplay and customization options, and expanded the gameplay recording feature. As Quake's multiplayer became popular, players began recording matches to study their performance or impress others with their skills. Director and animator Paul Marino noted that players shifted to recording deathmatches with a more cinematic flair, and that the player's point of view increasingly became that of a director as well. Groups of players known as clans hosted demo files on the web for easy distribution. Uwe Girlich, a German doctoral candidate, had documented the Quake demo file format, and suggested that Quake could replace a dedicated 3D modeling program.

One such Quake clan, the Rangers, had made a name for themselves with Quake highlight videos, and for their ability to program game modifications. Members of the Rangers conceived the idea to use Quake for filmmaking in August 1996, two months after the game's release. Clan member Heath "ColdSun" Brown recalled that after a long game session, clan members chatting in IRC discussed making demos to show off to the wider Quake community. "One of the members made a joke, saying something along the lines of 'wouldn't it be cool if we could make a movie out of a demo.' [We] sat for a second [...] as the wheels turned", and they excitedly began making plans.

The demo was recorded in Quake's networked multiplayer deathmatch mode. Even the simple story of the film required complex choreographing of the players in the scene, with one player's point of view acting as the camera from which action was perceived. As the film was created before any demo-editing software tools had been publicly released, clan member Eric "ArchV" Fowler instead created his own tools to reposition the camera, splice recorded footage, and place custom text in the demo files. Heath Brown wrote the story, and Matt "UnknownSoldier" Van Sickler was the director and camera. In the release notes, Brown credits clan members Chris "Sphinx" Birke and "Mute" with helping Fowler with movie packaging.

The Rangers released Diary of a Camper on October 26, 1996. While the film contained the usual action and gore of previous gameplay demos and deathmatches, it added the context of a simple story. It marked a transition from competitive, sportslike play to moviemaking, with players working as actors. Stanford University media curator Henry Lowood wrote that "Diary of a Camper broke with the demo movie as documented gameplay by moving away from the traditional first-person perspective of players."

Diary of a Camper and the films that it inspired were initially called "Quake movies"; the term machinima (a fusion of "machine" and "cinema") was coined in 1998, in response to the increasing use of other game engines to make similar content. Differentiating machinima from the demoscene and earlier demo recordings, Diary of a Camper is often called the first work of narrative machinima, or else the first work of machinima outright.

== Reception ==
Diary of a Camper was widely shared in the Quake demoscene, and later via rendered video versions on sites like Machinima.com, garnering millions of views. Despite the film's importance in establishing machinima, critics often panned the film's actual content. The plot was deemed simple, with Lowood writing that "the plot offers little more than a brief sequence of inside jokes". Major Quake movie review sites of the time called the film dull. Stephen Lum of The Cineplex criticized the film's sense of humor, but gave the film high marks for originality. Reviewer Paul Coates gave a negative review, but later commented on his low score of the film: "I feel I overreacted at the fact that Diary of a Camper was old. It's the first ever Quake movie. I have to give the Rangers massive credit for that... But, by today's standards, the [low rating] seems to fit." Despite the effort put into creating a narrative, authors Michele Knobel and Colin Lankshear noted that it still looks more like a straight recording of gameplay, rather than film. In comparison, professor Daniel Cermak-Sassenrath argued that despite the simplicity of the resulting work, "Diary of a Camper still displays an artistic vision and perspective that is informed by expert players."

Professor and video game researcher Riccardo Fassone described Diary of a Camper as a "ur-machinima", stating that it would go on to define machinima but that the medium would use more complex narratives and become more institutionalized in the following years. Diary of a Camper would be a major influence on other machinima creators and game developers; machinima makers Marino and Hugh Hancock described the film as an epiphany, a work that inspired and directed their own efforts. Works after Diary of a Camper immediately began to develop more sophisticated storytelling methods and narratives, and would break out of the gamer subcommunities they were created by. John Romero recalled that some developers introduced custom camera tools to facilitate machinima production in response to the film. Diary of a Camper was one of the first works to be included in the Machinima Archive, a collaboration among Stanford University, the Internet Archive, the AMAS, and machinima.com. The film has been included in machinima exhibitions, including a 2006 Australian Centre for the Moving Image exhibit.
