= Video Mods =

US television program

- Title screen
- Created by: Tony Shiff
- Directed by: Kris Renkewitz; Frank Drucker; Benjamin Porcari
- Country of origin: United States
- Original language: English
- No. of seasons: 2
- No. of episodes: 6 (40 music videos)

Production
- Executive producers: Alex Coletti; Tony Shiff
- Producers: Parrish Gust; Greg Lontkowski
- Editors: Terry Schwartz; Ron Douglas; John Laskas
- Running time: 30 minutes
- Production companies: Big Bear Entertainment; IBC Entertainment

Original release
- Network: MTV2
- Release: September 18, 2004 – July 22, 2005

Video Mods is an animated television series that aired on MTV2 which made music videos for existing songs featuring video game characters and assets. It was created by Tony Shiff of Big Bear Entertainment in 2003. A pilot aired in December 2003, having been underwritten by Electronic Arts. It was a form of branded entertainment, as the pilot featured characters from their games SSX 3, The Sims 2 and Need for Speed: Most Wanted.

In 2004, MTV2 Head of Programming Alex Coletti commissioned four new episodes which aired that fall. The pilot and all 2004 episodes were produced and directed by Shiff, with Animation Director Kris Renkewitz. In 2005, additional episodes were animated by IBC Digital and Elektrashock.

== Music videos ==
Game(s)	Band/Artist	Song
NBA Street V3	Beastie Boys	"Oh Word?"
Medal of Honor: European Assault	Yellowcard	"Only One"
SpongeBob SquarePants: Lights, Camera, Pants!	Blink-182	"All the Small Things"
Star Wars Episode III: Revenge of the Sith	Franz Ferdinand	"Take Me Out"
Death Jr.	My Chemical Romance	"I'm Not Okay (I Promise)"
Destroy All Humans!	Sum 41	"Pieces"
Darkwatch	Good Charlotte	"Predictable"
Dungeon Lords	Hoobastank	"The Reason"
Fight Night Round 2	Ying Yang Twins	"What's Happenin!"
Fight Club	Lil Jon & the East Side Boyz	"Get Low"
Half-Life 2	Breaking Benjamin	"So Cold"
The Sims 2	Fountains of Wayne	"Stacy's Mom"
BloodRayne 2	Evanescence	"Everybody's Fool"
Outlaw Golf 2	The Darkness	"I Believe in a Thing Called Love"
Leisure Suit Larry: Magna Cum Laude	Black Eyed Peas	"Shut Up"
BloodRayne 2, Jade Empire, Tribes: Vengeance, and Leisure Suit Larry: Magna Cum Laude	The Vines	"Ride (The Vines song)"
Tribes: Vengeance	The Von Bondies	"C'mon C'mon (The Von Bondies song)"
Dawn and Dusk	Evanescence	"Bring Me to Life"
Lineage II	The Killers	"Mr. Brightside"
Need for Speed: Most Wanted	T.I.	"Do Ya Thing"
BloodRayne 2, Jade Empire, Tribes: Vengeance, and Leisure Suit Larry: Magna Cum Laude	New Found Glory	"All Downhill from Here"
Star Wars: Battlefront II	Foo Fighters	"DOA"
SSX 3	Missy Elliott feat. Ludacris	"Gossip Folks"
SSX 3, The Sims 2, Tribes: Vengeance, and The Urbz: Sims in the City	Black Eyed Peas	"Let's Get It Started"
Jade Empire	Christina Milian	"Dip It Low"
Juiced	Jimmy Eat World	"Pain"
Silent Hill 4: The Room	Taking Back Sunday	"This Photograph Is Proof (I Know You Know)"
Indigo Prophecy	Queens of the Stone Age	"Little Sister"
Dance Dance Revolution Ultramix 3, Dance Dance Revolution Extreme 2, Karaoke Revolution Party	Ciara featuring Missy Elliott	"1, 2 Step"
SSX 3, The Sims 2, Unreal Tournament 2003, Tomb Raider: The Angel of Darkness, Sonic Heroes, Tom Clancy's Splinter Cell, Tony Hawk's Underground 2, Psi-Ops: The Mindgate Conspiracy, Crash Bandicoot, SpongeBob SquarePants, Leisure Suit Larry: Magna Cum Laude, and others	VG Unity	"Stand and Choose"
SWAT 4	The Used	"Take It Away"
X-Men Legends II: Rise of Apocalypse	Unwritten Law	"Save Me (Wake Up Call)"
Sid Meier's Pirates!	The All-American Rejects	"Dirty Little Secret"
Marc Ecko's Getting Up: Contents Under Pressure	Jane's Addiction	"Mountain Song"
L.A. Rush	Twista	"Hit the Floor"
EverQuest II	Avenged Sevenfold	"Bat Country"
The Sims 2: Nightlife	Weezer	"Beverly Hills"
Need for Speed: Most Wanted	PSC	"Do Your Thang"
Guitar Hero	Sum 41	"Fat Lip"
True Crime: New York City	Fat Joe	"Get It Poppin'"
