= Paul Marino =

American actor

- Occupation(s): Film director, producer, animator, voice actor, author

Paul Marino is a film director, producer, animator, voice actor, and author currently focused on machinima, the art of using engines from video games to create films. He is a co-founder and the executive director of the Academy of Machinima Arts & Sciences (AMAS), a non-profit organization formed in 2002 to promote and organize the growth of machinima. Marino also co-founded the ILL Clan, a machinima production group, and, working under the pseudonym ILL Robinson, helped to create a number of the group's machinima pieces. In particular, he directed Hardly Workin', an August 2000 comedy video that won a Best in SHO award in Showtime's alt.SHO.com Alternative Media Festival, held on February 8, 2001, and an award for Best Acting at the AMAS's 2002 Machinima Film Festival.

Independently of the ILL Clan, Marino has worked on other machinima projects. Using Valve's first-person shooter Half-Life 2, he created I'm Still Seeing Breen, a 2005 music video set to Breaking Benjamin's song "So Cold". The video aired on MTV2's television program Video Mods. He has worked with Rooster Teeth Productions on their Sims 2 machinima series, The Strangerhood, as both a voice actor and a visual effects designer. Working with Rooster Teeth, he also helped to develop Strangerhood Studios, a short spin-off series commissioned in 2005 by the Independent Film Channel. Strangerhood Studios was the first machinima series to be commissioned for broadcast, and won an award for Best Editing at the 2005 Machinima Film Festival.

Marino has since been hired by BioWare to work in the cutscenes for games such as Mass Effect and Star Wars: The Old Republic. Marino has also written the first book about machinima, 3D Game-Based Filmmaking: The Art of Machinima. Prior to his work in machinima, Marino was an animator who won an Emmy Award for his work with Turner Broadcasting System.

== Machinima filmography ==
Year	Title	Role
1999	Apartment Huntin'	Animator, assistant director, editor
2000	Quad God	Strollick (voice)
2000	Hardly Workin'	Director, producer
2003	Common Sense Cooking with Carl the Cook	Technical director
2004	Larry & Lenny on the Campaign Trail	3D characters, animation
2005	I'm Still Seeing Breen	Director, editor
2005–2006; 2015	The Strangerhood	Elder Sam (voice), visual effects
2006–2008	Red vs. Blue	Visual effects
