= Webedia =

French media company

Webedia S.A.
- Type: Société Anonyme
- Founded: 29 October 2007; 19 years ago
- Founders: Cédric Siré; Guillaume Multrier
- Headquarters: Levallois-Perret, France
- Area served: Worldwide
- Key people: Véronique Morali (Chairman), Marc Ladreit de Lacharrière (President and founder of Fimalac)
- Owner: Marc Ladreit de Lacharrière (through FIMALAC)
- Number of employees: 2,400 (2019)
- Divisions: Webedia Networks; Webedia Creators; Webedia Studios; Webedia Brand Xperiences
- Website: webedia.group

Webedia S.A. is a company specializing in online media, a subsidiary of the Fimalac group based in Levallois-Perret, France.

Webedia is active in more than twenty countries including France (AlloCiné, Jeuxvideo.com, MGG, Puremédias, Ode, Pureshopping, Volum, Terrafemina, 750g, easyVoyage, l’Automobile Magazine, Le 10 Sport), Brazil (AdoroCinema, Tudo Gostoso, Minhavida), Germany (Filmstarts, Moviepilot, GameStar), Spain and Latin America (Xataka, SensaCine, Raiser Games), Poland (Gry-Online and GetHero) and the United States (Boxoffice Pro).

== History ==
=== Early years (2007-2013) ===
Webedia was created in France in 2007, following the successive launches of the websites Purepeople, Puretrend and Purefans. Webedia bought the comparison shopping website Shopoon in 2008 and renamed it Pureshopping, and the website Ozap (media news) from M6 group in 2011 and renamed it Puremédias. Webedia was acquired by Fimalac in May 2013 and became its Internet media subsidiary.

=== Growth (2013-2016) ===
In 2013, Fimalac acquired AlloCiné, the websites Newsring and Youmag, the cooking website 750g and the cultural platform Exponaute. In 2014, Webedia acquired OverBlog, Jeuxvideo.com (through L'Odyssée Interactive and moved to Paris in 2015), Moviepilot (Germany), and Gameo Consulting (owner of Millenium, electronic sports), In December 2014, Webedia announced a license agreement with Ziff Davis to launch sites under the IGN franchise in Brazil and France at the beginning of 2015. The French version of IGN was launched on 2, it targets the general public and casual gamers. In 2015, Webedia acquired Côté Ciné Group (technological solutions for movie theaters and specialized press magazines: BoxOffice Pro in the United States and Côté Ciné in France), 57% of Easyvoyage group (online travel comparators Easyvol and Alibabuy, Mixicom (website JeuxActu and multi-channel network), 50% of the Brazilian network Paramaker, and West World Media (digital marketing company for the film industry). In 2016, Webedia bought Scimob (mobile video game studio), Surprizemi (home-delivered surprise boxes), Eklablog (blogging platform) Oxent (eSports World Convention), and Bang Bang Management (sports PR agency). In addition, an agreement is made with Paris Saint-Germain for Webedia to recruit and manage e-sports players on behalf of Paris Saint-Germain eSports.

On November 15, 2016, the LFP announced that it had reached an agreement with beIN Sports and Webedia for the broadcasting of the first edition of the e-League 1. The competition is renewed for two additional seasons on July 26, 2017, the broadcasting agreements are renewed. On December 8, 2016, Webedia joined forces with Chronopost to launch Pourdebon, a home delivery service that connects Internet users and labeled producers (AOC, organic AB, etc.). Webedia has a slight majority (53%) in this new platform.

=== 2017 ===
On January 19, 2017, Webedia announced the acquisition of the English company Peach Digital, specializing in web development and digital marketing for movie theaters. In February 2017, Le Figaro announced that Webedia had invested 10 million euros in Illico Fresco, a home delivery service for baskets of recipes. The same month, FDJ and Webedia announced a partnership for the creation of eSports competitions: a professional one (FDJ Masters League) and another one for amateur gamers (FDJ Open Series) starting in March 2017. They are broadcast on Webedia's Web TV. At the end of February 2017, the media group finalized the acquisition of MyPoseo, a SaaS publisher specialized on SEO analytics. On March 8, 2017, Webedia launched LeStream, a Twitch Web TV dedicated to video games, the result of two years of development, in the company of several YouTubers including Cyprien and Squeezie.

On March 29, 2017, Webedia bought the Brazilian web publisher Minha Vida, a website devoted to health, nutrition, beauty and fitness, which attracts 14.3 million unique monthly visitors. Webedia reaches 44 million unique visitors in Brazil, and thus becomes the leading publisher on entertainment themes.

In June 2017, the company made its largest international acquisition, with the American agency 3BlackDot, a media and marketing agency focused on videogamers. The agency, based in Los Angeles, manages 36 YouTubers followed by millions of subscribers on their channels which total 700 million videos viewed per month. In July 2017, Webedia bought IDZ, an audiovisual production company, and thus strengthened its production activities and its leadership on the YouTube channel networks in France.

That year, Webedia was the first French media group to use the measurement of their global audiences by Comscore. It represents deduplicated coverage on desktops, laptops, smartphones and tablets, and includes audiences for websites, mobile applications and videos. This new measure allows Webedia to establish a deduplicated global audience of 177 million unique visitors in April 2017.

In October 2017, Webedia announced its intention to launch a TV channel dedicated to electronic sports, called ES1. The channel was officially launched on January 10, 2018, on Orange TV and on February 6, 2018, on Free and Bouygues Telecom.

In November 2017, Webedia, with the support of CDC International Capital, entered into exclusive negotiations with the Saudi company Uturn Entertainment, specializing in online entertainment, particularly on YouTube, and the production of digital content for the region's youth, with a view to merging it with Diwanee, a Webedia subsidiary in the Middle East, for an amount close to $100 million.

In December 2017, Webedia acquired a majority stake in the United States–based company called Creators Media, which brings together social and video production platforms specializing in popular culture and entertainment. That same month, Webedia joined forces with Elephant, Emmanuel Chain's audiovisual production company, to create a new content production label aimed at Millennials.

=== 2018-2019 ===
In January 2018, Webedia launched a sports marketing agency: Only Sports & Passions. That same month, Illico Fresco, specialist in the delivery of kit meals belonging to Webedia, joined forces with Weight Watchers, the world leader in slimming products.

In April 2018, Webedia published new audience figures in partnership with Comscore, 188 million unique monthly visitors in December 2017, an increase of 6.2% compared to the previous measure dating from April 2017.

The same month, Webedia unveils its ambitions concerning content production, as a partnership with the video game studio Focus Home Interactive is signed with a title "Fear the Wolves" already planned for 2018, co-production projects of films, cartoons or series are announced.

In July 2018, Webedia bought the American authors company Full Fathom Five, a company that helps authors produce books, TV series, films and video games.

In October 2018, Webedia announced that it was focusing on both esports clubs PSG Esports and LeStream Esport. The first one being geared towards international competitions and the second devoted mainly to the French esports scene. The "Millenium" brand is thus refocusing around its media activities and esports merchandising products, and the "Millenium esport club" being gradually closed. The same month, the company announced the acquisition of Weblogs, a Spanish-speaking website publisher, thereby strengthening its activity in Spain and Latin America.

On October 22, 2018, Webedia announced the merger of BoxOffice magazine with Film Journal International.

On November 13, 2018, Groupe SEB announced the acquisition from Webedia of 750g International, the international branch of the French recipe site 750g (the original French website 750g.com being retained by Webedia). The group is thus separating from Gourmandize (United States and United Kingdom), HeimGourmet (Germany), Rebañando (Spain), Receitas Sem Fronteiras (Brazil / Portugal) and Tribù Golosa (Italy). The same month, Webedia joined forces with Riot Games to launch the French League of League of Legends (LFL), the first French professional league on the League of Legends game, which will bring together the 8 best teams on the French scene.

In March 2019, Webedia bought 51% of the audiovisual production company Elephant. The new set will weigh 500 million euros, a quarter of which will be made outside France. The same month, Webedia purchased a majority stake in the company Partoo, which publishes a SaaS platform specializing in local marketing for brands and merchants.

On March 14, 2019, a new measurement of the international audience of Webedia sites was produced by Comscore, posting 250 million unique visitors in December 2018, up 9.2% compared to December 2017.

In June 2019, the group joined forces with Michel Cymes, a famous doctor and French TV host by taking a majority stake in his company Club Santé Débat, in order to develop a health platform around the Dr. Good! Brand.

In September 2019, Webedia regrouped its cinematographic activities (AlloCiné, Côté Ciné Group, WestWorldMedia, Peach Digital) under the brand The Boxoffice Company for marketing, database and business intelligence services for film professionals.

In November 2019, the French YouTuber Michou joined the network of talents and influencers managed by Webedia.

On November 14, 2019, the movie Queen and Slim starring Daniel Kaluuya and Jodie Turner-Smith, co-produced by Webedia through its subsidiary 3BlackDot and distributed by Universal Pictures, was released in the United States. It grossed a total $47 million revenue worldwide.

In December 2019, Webedia announced the distribution of its ES1 channel dedicated to esport in Quebec in partnership with Thema (Canal+ group), then in January 2020 the distribution in France of the ES1 channel within the Canal+ offers.

=== 2020-present ===
On April 20, 2020, Webedia published a new measurement of the international audiences of its sites with Comscore, with 276 million unique monthly visitors measured in December 2019, an increase of 10.4% over one year.

In July 2020, Webedia announced that its ES1 TV channel brought together more than 1.3 million viewers in France. On July 28, 2020, the French League of League of Legends (LFL) produced by Webedia resumes service in a format adapted to the health crisis, with a final happening in Monaco on October 26, 2020.

In September 2020, the international tennis player Gael Monfils and Paralympic swimmer Théo Curin joined the portfolio of esports and sports talents managed by Webedia for their digital communication.

In October 2020, the 750g and Millenium sites announced an overhaul of their positioning and graphic identities. Millenium becomes MGG and develops in 5 international versions.

On October 4, 2020, Webedia and Banijay Iberia launched "Top Gamers Academy" in Spain, the first TV reality show in the world of video games. This program, which brings together the greatest Spanish YouTubers (El Rubius, The Grefg ...) is broadcast on the Spanish channel Neox and on social and video networks, in particular on Twitch and YouTube.

On November 16, 2020, Webedia joined forces with Jamy Gourmaud to create a new editorial brand around knowledge, called Epicurieux. The brand is available on social and video networks (Facebook, Instagram, YouTube, Snapchat) and contributes to a television program broadcast on France 5, produced by Elephant (Webedia group) and presented by Jamy Gourmaud, "C Jamy".

In December 2020, ES1 announced its arrival in France on Amazon's Prime Video service.

On January 19, 2021, the French League of League of Legends (LFL) produced by Webedia resumed for a third season.

In March 2021, Webedia brought together all of its new talent management labels under the Webedia Creators umbrella, and announcedthe arrival of the Tiktokers group "La French House" among its creators, as well as the company Smile Conseil (notably representing the influencer Just Riadh).

In May 2021, Webedia reinvested 15 million euros in its subsidiary Partoo, of which the group is the majority shareholder, in order to enable it to achieve a new stage in its international development.

== Activities ==
Webedia is present in around twenty countries: France, Germany, Spain, Brazil, Mexico, Argentina, Chile, Colombia, United States, United Kingdom, Poland, Turkey, Lebanon, United Arab Emirates, Saudi Arabia, Morocco, Tunisia, Singapore. Brazil is the group's leading country in terms of audience, with 60 million unique monthly visitors in December 2018, followed by France (48 million) and Spain (24 million).

Since 2020, Webedia has organized its activities around a "media-talents-production" triptych.

=== France ===
Webedia's activities in France, which reach a total of 48 million unique monthly visitors, include:

- AlloCiné, a digital platform dedicated to cinema and series with more than 13 million unique monthly visitors
- FilmsActu, a YouTube channel dedicated to movie and series trailers with more than 4 million subscribers
- The Boxoffice Company, a subsidiary offering services, technologies and magazines for cinema professionals
  - Boxoffice France and Le Plus, publications intended for distribution and cinematographic exhibition
- Jeuxvideo.com, a video game news website with 6.7 million unique monthly visitors
- MGG, a website specializing in esports with 2 million unique monthly visitors
- MGG TV (ex-ES1), the first French-speaking television channel 100% dedicated to esports
- JeuxActu, a website site dedicated to pop gaming culture, with 762,000 unique monthly visitors
- LeStream, a Web TV broadcast on Twitch with nearly 1 million subscribers
- ESWC, organizer of esports competitions
- 750g, a website offering cooking recipes with 10.3 million unique monthly visitors
- L'Académie du Goût, a culinary website offering tips from top chefs with 1.2 million unique monthly visitors
- Alain Ducasse Edition, a publishing collection of Webedia Books specializing in the culinary field
- Ode (ex-Purepeople), a website about celebrity news with 8 million unique monthly visitors
- Volum (ex-Purebreak), a news platform for Millennials with 3.5 million unique monthly visitors
- Puremédias, a media news website with 2.2 million unique monthly visitors
- Volum (ex-Purecharts), a music news website with 1.3 million unique monthly visitors
- Terrafemina, a feminist and committed news website, with 1.6 million unique monthly visitors
- Puretrend, a fashion news website with 170,000 unique monthly visitors
- Pureshopping, a fashion and decoration buying web guide
- easyVoyage, a travel comparison portal (also present in Italy, Spain, United Kingdom and Germany)
- L'officiel des vacances, a travel bargains website
- Blog creation platforms: OverBlog, CanalBlog and Eklablog
- 94%, a mobile game with more than thirty million downloads
- Talent Web, label to which the videographers Cyprien, Norman, Michou, Inoxtag, Bilal Hassani, Guillaume Pley, Mamytwink Aziatomik, Sora, Dooms are affiliated
- Bang Bang Management, a label bringing together personalities from the world of sport and competitive video games such as Domingo, Gaël Monfils, or Théo Curin
- Smile Conseil, label representing in particular the personalities Just Riadh and Fatou Guinea
- Talent Web Academy, the label for micro-influencers
- Sampleo, the nano-influence activity
- Elephant, which produces the programs Sept à Huit (TF1), Invitation au voyage (Arte), C Jamy (France 5), or the series Weekend Family (Disney +), Le Tueur du Lac (TF1), La Stagiaire (France 3), Fais pas ci, Fais pas ça (France 2), WorkinGirls (Canal+)
  - Nolita, who joined Elephant in 2021, and who produces feature films (Les Souvenirs, Il a déjà tes yeux, Brillantissime ...), fictions (Balle perdue on Netflix) and documentaries (Orelsan, never show this to anyone on Prime Video)
  - Kiosco, which produces the shows Spectaculaire (France 2), Le Grand Oral (France 2)
- IDZ, studio specializing in the creation of fictions, clips, advertising and promotional films. He notably ensures the executive production of the French series True Story (Prime Video).

=== Germany ===
Webedia's activities in Germany (10 million unique monthly visitors) include:

- Filmstarts, German version of Allociné
- Moviepilot, news platform on cinema and series
- GameStar, the leading video game news site in Germany (from the magazine of the same name)
- GamePro
- Mein MMO
- Allyance Network, a talent label specializing in video games and pop culture, which notably represents the PietSmiet collective
- Flow: fwd, a talent label representing influencers in the themes of video games, lifestyle, humor, fitness
- Flimmer, an event production agency specializing in the movie and entertainment industries

=== Brazil ===
Webedia's activities in Brazil reach 60 million unique monthly visitors on the following activities:

- AdoroCinema (Brazilian version of Allociné), with 12 million unique monthly visitors
- IGN Brasil, with 3.4 million unique monthly users
- MGG Brasil, site specializing in esports with 1 million unique monthly visitors
- TudoGostoso, with 15 unique monthly visitors
- Purepeople, with 4 million unique monthly visitors
- Purebreak, with 1.8 million unique monthly visitors
- Hypeness, site dedicated to innovation and creativity
- Parafernalha, a humorous channel with 12.5 million subscribers on YouTube and 5.5 million on Facebook
- Minhavida, the largest Brazilian health and wellness portal with 19 million unique monthly visitors

=== Spain ===
Webedia España has different assets that collect 24 million unique monthly visitors:

- SensaCine (Spanish version of Allociné)
- Espinof
- 3DJuegos, a video game news website
- IGN Spain
- MGG Spain
- Director al paladar
- Poprosa
- Vitonica
- Trendencias
- Decoesfera
- Compradiccion
- Motorpasion
- Xataka, the leading high-tech news website in Spain
- Applesfera
- Genbeta
- Magnet
- Vizz, a talent agency which notably represents El Rubius, Willyrex, and Vegetta777.
- Raiser Games, a video game studio which notably publishes Youtubers Life.

=== Mexico and Latin America ===
Webedia gathers 40 million unique monthly visitors in Mexico and Latin America, on the following activities:

- SensaCine Mexico (Mexican version of Allociné) with 10 million unique monthly visitors in the area
- 3DJuegos Mexico, the Mexican version of the Spanish video game news website, with 6 million unique monthly visitors in the area
- Director al paladar Mexico, with 3 million unique monthly visitors in the area
- Motorpasion Mexico, with more than 3 million unique monthly visitors in the area
- Xataka Mexico, the leading Spanish-speaking high-tech news site with more than 20 million unique monthly visitors in the area
- Vizz Latam, a talent agency which notably represents Anna Sarelly, Azttek Wolf and Isa Salas.

=== United States ===
Webedia is present in the United States through the following activities:

- The Boxoffice Company, a subsidiary offering services, technologies and magazines for film professionals, resulting from the acquisitions of Côté Ciné Group, West World Media, Peach Digital and Film Journal International. It publishes in particular:
  - BoxOffice Pro, professional film magazine created in 1920
- 3BlackDot, a talent agency and influencers on YouTube and Twitch, notably representing VanossGaming
- 3BlackDot, with the production of the movie Queen and Slim, and the game Dead Realm.

=== Turkey ===
Webedia is present in Turkey around a single activity:

- Beyazperde (Turkish version of Allociné)

=== Middle-East ===
Webedia co-owns with Five Capital (CDC International Capital) the subsidiary Webedia Arabia, a merger of its previous subsidiary Diwanee and the company Uturn Entertainment, with establishments in the United Arab Emirates, Lebanon and Saudi Arabia.

- Saudi Gamer
- MGG MENA
- Atyabtabkha
- Yasmina
- 3a2ilati
- Uturn Entertainment
- Full Stop Creatives
- Made in Saudi Films

== Organization ==
Cédric Siré is CEO of Webedia and Véronique Morali President of the Board.

On September 17, 2015, the group inaugurated its new headquarters in Levallois-Perret in presence of Axelle Lemaire, Véronique Morali, the president of the group's management board, Marc Ladreit de Lacharrière, founder and CEO of Fimalac (parent company of Webedia) and Cédric Siré, CEO of Webedia, and its new flagship YouTubers and creators.
