= Fimalac =

Financière Marc de Lacharrière S.E.
- Type: Societas Europaea
- Traded as: Euronext: FIM
- Industry: Financial services, Investment management
- Founded: 1991
- Headquarters: Paris, France
- Key people: Marc Ladreit de Lacharrière (Founder and CEO)
- Products: Credit ratings, Commercial real estate, Private equity fund
- Subsidiaries: North Colonnade Ltd, Fimalac Développement; Webedia
- Website: www.fimalac.com

Financière Marc de Lacharrière S.E. (known as Fimalac) is a French holding company focusing on credit rating and risk management companies. It manages commercial real estate through North Colonnade Ltd, and private equity funds through its subsidiary Fimalac Développement.

== History ==
Fimalac was created by Marc Ladreit de Lacharrière in 1991. He is the CEO, and holds 100% of the shares of the FIMALAC Group, that holds ~80% of Fimalac. It is headquartered in Paris. It operates in the United States, Canada, the United Kingdom, France and other members of the European Union, Asia, and South America.

In 2005, Fimalac acquired Algorithmics Inc., which it sold to IBM in October 2011. That year, it acquired 40% of Groupe Lucien Barrière.

In 2018, Fimalac sold its last 20% of Fitch Ratings to Hearst Communications.

== Divisions ==
=== North Colonnade Ltd. ===
Fimalac operates in the real estate sector, mainly through North Colonnade Ltd. North Colonnade owns a major office building project in the Canary Wharf estate in London set to open in 2009. Part of the building will be occupied by Fitch Group. This 320,000 sq ft property is expected to generate recurring revenues for Fimalac over a long period.

=== Fimalac Développement ===
The company has a diversified investment portfolio through its Fimalac Développement subsidiary. The private equity fund acquires stakes in competitive companies with growth potential. Fimalac owns stakes in companies such as Stadôme, Auguri Productions, and a 34% interest in Groupe Lucien Barrière from Accor.

=== Webedia S.A. ===
Webedia logo since 2022.

Webedia Group, founded in France in 2007, is a subsidiary of Fimalac since 2013. It specializes in online publishing and now operates in multiple countries. Webedia properties include: Puremédias, Overblog, IGN France, Terrafemina, AlloCiné, Jeuxvideo.com in France; GamePro Germany (de), IGN Deutschland, GameStar, Moviepilot.de in Germany; GetHero, Gry-Online.pl and Gamepressure.com in Poland; IGN España, 3DJuegos, Vizz Agency in Spain; Boxoffice Pro in the United States; and other local versions of Vizz Agency, IGN, 3DJuegos, Allociné, etc. in Brazil, Latin America, Turkey, Saudi Arabia.
