= List of multi-channel networks =

This is a list of notable multi-channel networks. Multi-channel networks (MCNs) are organizations that work with video platforms such as YouTube to offer assistance in areas such as "product, programming, funding, cross-promotion, partner management, digital rights management, monetization/sales, and/or audience development", usually in exchange for a percentage of the AdSense revenue from the channel.

== Based in Oceania ==
- Valleyarm (Australia)
- Seven Network (Australia)
- The Audience (New Zealand)

== Based in Africa ==
- e.tv (South Africa)
- SABC (South Africa)
- Télévision Centrafricaine (CAR)
- Ennahar TV (Algeria)
- Murphy Ben International (Nigeria)
- SSBC TV (South Sudan)

== Based in Asia ==
- Adober Studios formerly Chicken Pork Adobo (Philippines) (went defunct in 2020)
- YG Entertainment (South Korea)
- Parable Entertainment (South Korea)
- Brave Group (Japan)
- GeeXPlus (Japan)
- Hololive Production (Japan)
- Nijisanji (Japan)
- Mei One (China)
- Uturn Entertainment (Saudi Arabia)
- UUUM (Japan)
- TV Derana (Sri Lanka)
- Diwan Videos (UAE)
- PING Network (India)
- PanMedia (Taiwan)
- WebTVAsia (Malaysia)

== Based in Europe ==
- Brave Bison (UK)
- ChannelFlip (Banijay) (UK)
- Diagonal View (Comcast) (UK)
- Moonbug Entertainment (Candle Media) (UK)
- WildBrain London (WildBrain) (UK)
- Yogscast (UK)
- Starlight Media (Ukraine)
- Studio71 (Germany)
- Mediakraft Networks (Germany) (Went Defunct in 2021)
- Zoomin.TV (Netherlands)
- Webedia (France)
- DistroMotion (Spain)
- CMTV (Portugal)

== Based in the Americas ==
- Above Average Productions (Broadway Video) (U.S.)
- Alloy Entertainment (Warner Bros. Discovery) (U.S.)
- AwesomenessTV (Paramount Skydance Corporation) (Went defunct in 2025) (U.S.)
- BroadbandTV Corp (Bertelsmann) (Canada)
- Channel Awesome (U.S.)
- Channel Frederator Network (Wow Unlimited Media) (U.S.)
- Curse: Union for Gamers (Amazon) (U.S.)
- Defy Media (Went defunct in 2018) (U.S.)
- Disney Digital Network (Formerly Maker Studios, went defunct in 2019) (U.S.)
- Discovery Digital Networks (Warner Bros. Discovery) (Went defunct in 2016) (U.S.)
- Fullscreen (Warner Bros. Discovery) (Went defunct in 2021) (U.S.)
- The Game Theorists
- JETPAK
- Jukin Media (U.S.)
- Kin Community (U.S.)
- Machinima (went defunct in 2019) (Warner Bros. Discovery) (U.S.)
- My Damn Channel (U.S.)
- NormalBoots Inc.
- OfflineTV (U.S.)
- Omnia Media (Enthusiast Gaming) (Canada)
- ONErpm (Amazon) (U.S.)
- One True King (U.S.)
- Pocket.watch (U.S.)
- Rooster Teeth (Box Canyon) (U.S.)
- Style Haul (Bertelsmann) (U.S.)
- Symphonic Distribution (U.S.)
- TYT Network
- Vevo (Universal / Sony) (U.S.)
- VShojo (U.S.)
- Warner Music Group (U.S.)
- Caracol Televisión (Colombia)
- TV Globo (Brazil)

== See also ==
- Cost per mille
- Cost per impression
