= Warner/Chappell Music Inc. v. Fullscreen Inc. =

American court case

Warner/Chappell Music Inc. et al. v. Fullscreen Inc. et al.
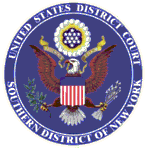
- Court: United States District Court for the Southern District of New York

Holding
- A settlement was reached requiring Fullscreen to remove all unlicensed videos on its company YouTube channel. Fullscreen's partners were to obtain licenses for past and future content.

Keywords
- Copyright infringement, multi-channel network, mechanical license

Warner/Chappell Music Inc. et al. v. Fullscreen Inc. et al. (13-cv-05472[1]) was a legal case filed against the multi-channel network Fullscreen. The National Music Publishers Association initiated the lawsuit on behalf of Warner/Chappell Music and 15 other music publishers. The case claimed that Fullscreen profited from unlicensed cover videos on YouTube and allegedly failed to pay royalties to the publishers and songwriters entitled to them.

According to the lawsuit, the defendant Fullscreen was accused of having "willfully ignored their obligation to obtain licenses and pay royalties to exploit the vast majority of the musical content disseminated over Fullscreen's networks." Among the musical content that Fullscreen allegedly infringed upon were songs by Justin Bieber, Kesha, Kanye West, Lady Gaga and Katy Perry.

== Facts ==
The National Music Publishers Association filed this copyright infringement lawsuit in the Southern District of New York on August 6, 2013, accusing Fullscreen of four copyright violations:

1. Direct copyright infringement
2. Contributory copyright infringement
3. Inducement of copyright infringement
4. Vicarious copyright infringement

The plaintiff suggested that Fullscreen:

1. Copied directly from another's work without a license (direct infringement).
2. Contributed to and supported its partners' infringement (contributory copyright infringement).
3. Is liable for the actions of its partners' infringement and directly profited financially from the act (vicarious infringement).
4. Knowingly aided/induced the act of infringement.

Before this, the NMPA filed a similar lawsuit against another multi-channel network, Maker Studios, which subsequently agreed to settle out of court and establish a compensation model for both past infringements and future licenses that comply with the Copyright Act.

=== NMPA ===
The National Music Publishers' Association (NMPA) is a trade association for American music publishers and songwriters, including Warner/Chappell Music and Palm Valley Music. It was established in 1917 and had over 300 members in 2014.

=== Fullscreen ===
Fullscreen is one of the largest YouTube multi-channel networks, generating over three billion monthly video views across all its channels. The company was founded in January 2011 by CEO George Strompolos and includes some of YouTube's prominent talent, such as Lindsey Stirling, The Fine Brothers, Tyler Ward, and Megan Nicole. According to the company, Fullscreen is affiliated with over 15,000 YouTube channels that collectively have 200 million subscribers and generate over 2.5 billion views per month. Fullscreen attracts more than 30 million visitors monthly, across all their channels. Like many other multi-channel networks, Fullscreen consists primarily of channels with covered musical content. The network generates revenue from the advertising generated by these unlicensed music videos.

== Result ==
A settlement was reached that required Fullscreen creators to license their music videos or remove them. The channel managed by Fullscreen was to remove all offending videos entirely — whereas Fullscreen partners were allowed to license these videos. George Strompolos, Fullscreen CEO, commented:

Fullscreen is pleased to be one of the leading multi-channel networks to establish landmark licenses with major music publishers on behalf of Fullscreen's music artists. We commend the NMPA for their proactiveness and helping to clear the way for us to establish new relationships with music publishers. Fullscreen will continue to pioneer 'win/win/win' solutions for emerging musicians, their audiences, and existing rights holders within the music industry.

— George Strompolos

David Israelite, NMPA president and CEO, noted:

This settlement demonstrates the fundamental value of songwriters and their music publishing partners, and highlights NMPA's mission to fight for fair compensation and protection of songwriters' rights.

— David Israelite

After the settlement, Fullscreen and Maker Studios announced a deal with Universal Music Publishing Group, which allows the networks access and monetization of Universal's entire music library.

== Background ==
=== Multi-channel networks ===
Multi-channel networks (MCNs) work with YouTube channels, providing support for funding, rights management, audience development, and monetization. While not affiliated with nor endorsed by Google, MCNs receive a portion of the advertising revenue generated by the YouTube channels they work with. Recently, it has become more common for MCNs to work with brands on integrated marketing and incorporate advertising within a YouTube creator's video. Though MCNs can offer YouTube creators connections to brands and sponsorship deals, as well as financial support, there has been some criticism of their practices. YouTube personality Ray William Johnson left his MCN Maker Studios when he was asked to renegotiate his contract and relinquish 40% of his advertising revenue and 50% of the intellectual property of his show - Equals Three.

=== Content ID ===
Content ID is a system developed by YouTube (owned by Google) in 2007 that scans every video uploaded to YouTube for copyright infringement. Should Content ID detect the usage of content registered by copyright holders in a user-generated video, it notifies the rights-holder and provides them with the option to:

1. Monetize the video.
2. Block the video completely.
3. Track the video and gain all analytical insights.

YouTube producers may dispute or appeal Content ID claims. Content ID has enabled content owners to monitor the usage of their content and manage its availability and monetization on YouTube. Uploaders receive a strike for each case of copyright infringement, and their accounts are suspended after receiving three strikes. YouTubers and certain publishers have entered into blanket synchronization licenses, allowing publishers to receive up to 50% of the revenues from videos using their content. YouTube has direct licensing agreements with many music publishers, which pay royalties for cover songs uploaded by YouTubers. Multi-channel networks like Fullscreen, however, are not covered under these contracts.

=== Viacom International, Inc. v. YouTube, Inc. ===
Copyright infringement cases involving unlicensed videos on YouTube date back before the case between the NMPA and Fullscreen. In 2007, Viacom filed a lawsuit against Google over alleged copyright violations on its YouTube platform. In March 2014, the two companies announced a settlement, noting that "Google and Viacom today jointly announced the resolution of the Viacom vs. YouTube copyright litigation. This settlement reflects the growing collaborative dialogue between our two companies on important opportunities and we look forward to working more closely together." When the lawsuit was filed, Viacom sought $1 billion in damages from Google, accusing YouTube of permitting users to upload thousands of Viacom-owned videos without licenses, which they described as "brazen" and "massive" copyright infringement. In 2010, Google's motion for summary judgment was granted, dismissing the case based on the Digital Millennium Copyright Act's "safe harbor" provisions. Viacom's appeal was subsequently denied, with District Judge Stanton granting summary judgment in favor of Google in April 2013.

== Related issues ==
- Copyright infringement
- Viacom International Inc. v. YouTube, Inc.
- Content ID
- Copyright Act of 1976
- Digital Millennium Copyright Act
- Lenz v. Universal Music Corp.
