= Creative Nation, MCN =

YouTube media network

Creative Nation Network
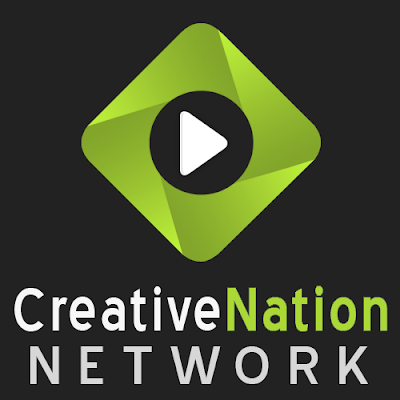
- Country: Ireland
- Broadcast area: International
- Network: Multi-Channel Network (MCN) for YouTube Creators
- Headquarters: Dublin, Ireland

Programming
- Language: English

Ownership
- Owner: Creative Nation Network

History
- Founded: 2013

Links
- Website: creativenationnetwork.com

Creative Nation Network, YouTube MCN. was a global media network that operated a Multi-Channel Network (MCN) on the YouTube platform. It was the largest MCN in Ireland and within the top 5 MCNs based in Europe. Creative Nation offered support, scaled technologies and additional revenue streams to its clients and in return takes a share of their YouTube channel's revenue.

Creative Nation Network rose to popularity for offering their clients a 90% share of their channel's revenue compared to the then industry-average of 60%. As of December 2014, Creative Nation had a combined global reach of 500 million views per month.

Creative Nation's website has been offline since 2017, and the company appears to no longer be actively operating as an MCN. They continued to produce original content for their Owned & Operated channel, Facts. until February 2018. CEO Shane C said in a statement to Fora, that the channel had never churned a full year of profit, and had lost over $12,000,000 over its 4 years of operation.

The company resumed work in January 2021.

== History ==
Creative Nation Network was founded in October 2013 by current Chief Executive Officer Shane C. Shane had previously been employed as a talent scout for another YouTube MCN, Forela Digital and was responsible for signing up talent with a combined more than 40 million monthly viewer-ship to that network.

Creative Nation Network also owned AdLeap, a fully owned Creative Nation subsidiary founded in February 2015 that engaged with brands and media-buying agencies to create promotional advertising campaigns on YouTube with both creators in Creative Nation Network MCN and externally.

== See also ==
- List of multi-channel networks
