= Fondation Culture et Diversité =

French foundation

Fondation Culture et Diversité is a private foundation in France. It aims at helping young people from HLM housing projects start a career in the arts.

== Overview ==
It was founded by Marc Ladreit de Lacharrière, the CEO of FIMALAC, in 2006. The director is Eléanore Ladret de Lacharrière, his daughter.

It has an endowment of 15 million euros. It has partnered with the École du Louvre, La Fémis, and the Théâtre du Rond-Point.

According to journalist Évelyne Pieiller, "the operation is a major success in two respects: it consecrates the intrusion of the private into the public, since the foundation, directed by Éléonore Ladreit de Lacharrière, daughter of the billionaire, relies on a partnership tripartite with the Ministries of National Education and Culture; and it tends to influence curricula by differentiating school "publics"».
