= Omar Hussein =

Stand-up comedian (born 1986)

- Born: May 21, 1986 (age 40); United States

Comedy career
- Years active: 2009 – present
- Medium: Stand-up, YouTube
- Genres: Observational comedy, Satire, Character comedy, Improvisational comedy

Omar Hussein (Arabic: عمر حسين; born May 21, 1986) is a content creator and media and communications consultant. Since 2010, he has accumulated over 100 million views across multiple platforms. Hussein has hosted TV talk shows on major Arab networks OSN and MBC and is an inaugural member of YouTube's Creators for Change, an initiative seeking to spotlight creators around the world who use their platforms to promote social causes. Hussein has also worked alongside the UNHCR to tackle empathy fatigue towards refugees in the Middle East. He is currently a Ph.D. student of Media and Communications at Temple University, researching the efficacy of online influencers to attract donors to non-profit organizations.

== Education ==
In 2007, Hussein graduated from King Fahd University of Petroleum and Minerals with a Bachelor of Science in Applied Chemical Engineering. After working as an engineer for several years, Hussein enrolled at the University of Kent and completed his Master's in Business Administration in 2015. He worked in marketing and business-related posts before beginning a Ph.D. in Media and Communication at Temple University.

== Professional career ==
As an engineer, Hussein worked for Schlumberger, Baker Hughes, and Procter & Gamble. In 2014, Hussein became the CEO of the media production start-up UTURN, and afterward worked as a marketing director for Careem, a subsidiary of Uber. In 2019, he co-founded a social media marketing and production agency.

Starting in 2010, Hussein has written and performed Arabic-language web series content for Saudi production company Uturn entertainment, under the channel name 3al6ayer (Arabic: على الطاير, "On the Fly"). He specializes in blending stand-up comedy with social criticism. 3al6ayer has seen success in the emerging Saudi YouTube landscape, amassing over 60 million views over three seasons.

In 2014, Hussain created and presented another show, Truth to Be Told, in collaboration with Uturn. He also appeared on the OSN talk show Aljamea and created content for Yahoo during the 2014 World Cup in Brazil. In 2017, MBC signed Hussein for another talk show, Majles Alshabab.

== Initiatives and charity campaigns ==
In 2014, Hussein started Qomami, an initiative to address growing health problems from the overconsumption of fast foods in Saudi Arabia. Qomami was awarded the Best Health Initiative award by the Ministry of Health of Saudi Arabia.

In 2016, Hussein and group of other creators collaborated with the UN High Commission for Refugees to raise awareness for the conditions at refugee camps in different countries, both by providing commentary and recording on-site videos and photography. In 2017, YouTube chose Hussein as one of 13 global Content for Change ambassadors. Soon after, he produced an anti-hate speech music video that received more than 6 million views on YouTube.

In 2021, Omar participated in the United Nations Alliance of Civilizations (UNAOC) EDIN program to promote peace and co-existence.
