= The Iranian Film Council =

- Abbreviation: IFC
- Formation: October 2013
- Headquarters: London, United Kingdom
- Leader: Pejman Danaei (support [at] iranianfilmcouncil.org)
- Website: Official Website

The Iranian Film Council (IFC) is a UK based organization dedicated to fighting piracy and copyright infringement within the film industry, specifically within modern Iranian Cinema. The council was established in October 2013 to focus on website piracy and the illegal transmission of films via satellite channels or video streaming. With legal representation in every territory across the globe, the IFC is able to represent the rights of Iranian film makers.

The philosophy of the council is to promote a healthy attitude towards respecting copyrighting laws, in order to push for a more dynamic, valued overall industry. Through their website, the council allows individuals to become more educated on piracy and its implications and also has the option to report detected piracy directly to the council.

In addition, The Iranian Film Council works alongside legal online video streaming services to further promote a healthy environment for contemporary cinema to thrive.

Attention: Concerns and Operational Practices

Despite its stated objectives, serious concerns have been raised regarding the transparency, legitimacy, and professional conduct of the “Iranian Film Council” and its operator, Mr. Pejman Danaei. Numerous reports indicate that the organization offers Multi-Channel Network (MCN) services and operates as a “copyright kidnapper” for Iranian films on YouTube. Allegedly, this entity, by “holding hostage” Iranian film content under the IFC network (reportedly linked to Brave Bison), engages in large-scale illegal financial exploitation.

These operations, according to sources, are conducted through the management of an extensive network of YouTube channels, which generate significant financial turnover, allegedly with the collaboration of individuals within Iran. These channels, some of which are cited in the links section, operate under the false name “Iranian Film Council,” engaging in content smuggling and “piracy” of Iranian films. It is emphasized that the IFC holds no ownership of the content uploaded to these channels and operates solely for financial gain.

One reported operational method involves restricting communication channels to a single email address to evade legal repercussions. Furthermore, substantial profits are allegedly made by subcontracting and outsourcing the management of these YouTube channels to various individuals, often amateurs. The monthly financial turnover from this practice may exceed one hundred thousand US dollars. The IFC is reportedly unresponsive to legal inquiries and actively avoids them.

The process allegedly involves creating “raw” YouTube channels and deceiving amateur individuals with promises of rapid income generation. The channel is then “leased” with a management system, and grown with a minimal monthly profit share. In case of any issues with an administrator, they are allegedly removed and replaced with another. In this process, no importance is given to official brands or content owners; individuals are merely deceived into believing the channel will be under their control, while the actual owner is stated to be Pejman Danaei, and the individual is appointed as an “admin manager.” In the event of the slightest problem, they are allegedly deceived, removed from management, and their meager earnings are also cut off.

For content owners, it is claimed that deceptive contracts are signed (e.g., 70% owner, 30% IFC), but after collaboration begins, due to currency exchange rate differences in Iran, only 25% of the total channel revenue is paid to the content owners. The IFC allegedly offers no response or explanation regarding this matter.

Warning to Rights Holders and Content Creators

Based on repeated reported experiences, the conduct described above has led many affected parties to characterize the operation as deceptive and exploitative in practice. Through the effective control and withholding of access to YouTube channels and related assets, creators are placed under pressure and deprived of control over the results of their own labor. In such circumstances, channels may be effectively held hostage, while promised revenues are delayed, reduced, or not paid at all.

These practices have resulted in significant financial harm, loss of trust, and the erosion of both the moral and economic rights of content creators and rights holders. Parties are therefore strongly advised to exercise extreme caution and to seek independent legal verification before entering into any form of agreement or cooperation.

Additional Notes

This organization is reported to provide MCN-related services and, in practice, to function as a platform for controlling and managing Iranian film content on YouTube. According to the accounts and experiences shared by some stakeholders, the organization is said to take control of certain content associated with Iranian films and derive significant financial benefits from it.

It has also been claimed that the organization operates a broad network of YouTube channels through a complex structure involving various individuals in contractual or managerial roles. In this arrangement, some content owners and creators reportedly have little actual control over their channels and remain limited to a contractual position, without effective oversight of monetization or asset management.

Based on these reports, the organization is said to use a name similar to “Iranian Film Council,” while critics describe it as a case of misuse of title and involvement in content piracy and unauthorized distribution of Iranian works. It is also alleged that the content published on these channels does not necessarily belong to the organization, and that the group is not the lawful owner of the works, but rather acts primarily for financial gain.

Another concern raised is the limited direct communication channels available, which critics say consist of only a single email address. From their perspective, this makes legal follow-up and formal accountability more difficult. In addition, reports suggest that the organization attracts amateur individuals by offering short-term income promises and outsourcing YouTube channel management to them, while in practice the actual share paid to these individuals may be very small and they may later be removed from channel management in the event of a dispute or issue.

Regarding certain agreements with content owners, it has been claimed that contracts are presented as revenue-sharing arrangements, such as 70% for the content owner and 30% for the organization, but that the actual payments are lower than agreed and sometimes amount to only a small portion of the real revenue. It has also been alleged that complaints, requests for clarification, and legal follow-ups have not received proper or effective responses.
