= Just Riadh =

French Internet celebrity and actor

- Born: Riadh Belaïche; July 3, 1998 (age 27); Sidi Bel Abbès wilaya, Algeria
- Occupations: Social media personality; Actor
- Years active: 2017–present
- Agent(s): Smile Conseil, Adéquat

Instagram information
- Page: justriadh
- Followers: 4.5 million

TikTok information
- Page: riadhlevrai
- Followers: 6.6 million (March 05, 2023)

YouTube information
- Genre: Humor
- Subscribers: 1.43 million (5 Mar 2023)
- Views: 97 million (5 Mar 2023)

Riadh Belaïche (French: [ɾjad belaiʃ]; born 3 July 1998), also known by his pseudonym Just Riadh, is an Algerian-born French Internet celebrity and actor. In 2023, he plays the main character in the movie Sugar and Stars (À la belle étoile in French) and embodies the French pastry chef Yazid Ichemrahen.

== Early life ==
Belaïche was born in Sidi Bel Abbès wilaya in Algeria. When he was eight, he moved to the Paris region with his family, living first in Drancy and later in Magny-le-Hongre. As a child, he dreamed of becoming a professional footballer.

== Career ==
Under the pseudonym riadhtheone, Belaïche started making humorous videos on social networks when he was a teenager.

He collaborated in 2017 for the first time at age 18 with other social media personalities and appeared in the video Saïd & Paul: Les Gens sur Twitter (transl. People on Twitter) by Paul Darbos and Saïd Bengriche broadcast on YouTube. He stopped the videos to focus on his studies. After obtaining his baccalauréat, he went to a BTS but stopped to restart videos on social networks. A friend of him posted one of his videos on Facebook and it got millions of views. In November 2017, French rapper Booba also shares one of his videos on Instagram.

In 2020, Belaïche played the role of Wejdene's boyfriend in her music video clip Coco.

In 2021, he confronted his haters in the documentary J’aime pas Just Riadh (I hate Just Riadh in English) made by the French media Brut on BrutX.

In 2022, he collaborated with several brands like Canal+, Puma, Paco Rabanne and LVMH and is elected influencer of the year 2022 by Stratégies magazine.

Belaïche has acted in several films and television series like 30 jours max (transl. 30 Days Left) (2020), Stalk (2021) or LOL, qui rit, sort! on Amazon Prime (2022). In 2022, he participated in the French reality game show Pekin Express: Duos de choc on M6 with his bestfriend.

In 2023, Belaïche acted as the main character of the movie À la belle étoile (transl. Sugar and Stars) and played the role of Yazid Ichemrahen, world champion of frozen desserts in 2014.

== Filmography ==
Films
Year	Film	Role	Notes
2017	Saïd & Paul : People on Twitter (YouTube)	Riadhtheone	Short film by Saïd Bengriche and Paul Darbos
2020	30 Days Left	Sammy	
2020	Les sacrifiés (YouTube)	Sabri Djebari	Short film by Jordan Pavlik
2023	Sugar and Stars	Yazid Ichemrahen	Main role
2024	GTmax (Netflix)	Michael Carella	
2026	N121 - Bus de nuit	Aïssa	
TV
Year	Title	Role	Notes
2020	All the Way Up (Canal+)	Himself	Season 1; guest role; episode 5
2020	Kiffe aujourd’hui (France.tv Slash)	Riad	Web-serie; season 2; main role
2020	Stalk (France.tv Slash)	Justin	Web-serie; season 2; 10 episodes
2021	Belle, belle, belle (TF1)	Ryan	TV film; remake of I Feel Pretty
2021	Driven Round the Bend (Arte)	Nasser	TV film
2022	LOL, qui rit, sort! (Amazon Prime)	Participant	TV series; season 2
