= NMPA =

NMPA may refer to:

- National Medical Products Administration, Chinese pharmaceutical and medical regulatory body
- National Music Publishers' Association, American music publishing industry trade association
