= AlloCiné =

Organization providing information on French cinema

- Website type: Film database
- Available in: French
- Owner: Webedia (FIMALAC)
- Creators: Jean-David Blanc & Patrick Holzman
- Website: www.allocine.fr
- Commercial: Yes
- Launched: 1993; 33 years ago
- Current status: Active

AlloCiné is an entertainment website founded by Jean-David Blanc in 1988, then joined by Patrick Holzman. It has been owned by Webedia since 2013. It specializes in providing information on French cinema, mostly centering on novelties' promotion with DVD, Blu-ray, and VOD information. In 2005, it began covering television series. The website is considered the "French equivalent of IMDb."

Initially, Allociné was a telephone information service providing cinema program details. It later transitioned into an Internet portal, offering extensive information on all movies distributed in France. The service was known for its easy-to-remember number (40 30 20 10, later 01 40 30 20 10) and lack of additional call charges, distinguishing it from competitors. The voice of Allociné, performed by Patrice Baudrier, became popular and was notably parodied by Gad Elmaleh. The company diversified its offerings to establish itself as a leading web portal for cinema information in France.

In 2000, Allociné launched Allociné Télévision, a television channel dedicated to cinema news, films, and those who create them. In 2005, Allociné expanded its database to include television series. Between 2011 and 2012, Allociné operated an online television channel called Allociné TV and launched Allociné Productions, a subsidiary focused on audiovisual production.

AlloCiné was launched in 1993, before being purchased by Canal+ in 2000 and Vivendi Universal in 2002. From June 2007 to 2013, it was under the ownership of Tiger Global, an American investment fund. 98% of Allociné was purchased by FIMALAC, a French holding company owned by Marc Ladreit de Lacharrière, for 66.9 million euros. Allociné subsequently became affiliated with Webedia, a company owned by Fimalac.

In January 2015, Allociné, along with SensCritique, Première, and Télérama, was one of four platforms selected by the CNC as partners for the launch of its VOD offer search engine. On 5 September 2011, AlloCiné launched AlloCiné TV, a now-defunct private TV channel.

== History ==
=== 1990s ===
In 1988, Jean-David Blanc developed the concept of an automated telephone information service for cinema showtimes in Paris. The brand AlloCiné was registered in October 1988. Patrick Holzman later joined the project, and it was officially launched during the Fête du Cinéma in June 1993. By 1994, the service expanded to include ticket reservations. In 1995, the service was made available on Minitel and remained operational until shortly before Minitel's discontinuation in 2012. In 1997, AlloCiné launched its website, www.allocine.fr, and introduced a mobile version via WAP.

=== 2000s ===
Allociné expanded into teleshopping in August 2000 through the acquisition of cinestore.com, a website selling film-related merchandise and videos. At that time, online ticket sales accounted for only 15 to 20% of Allociné's revenue. On September 5, 2000, Allociné launched the thematic channel Allociné Télévision on CanalSatellite, with music composed by Michel Legrand.

In 2001, after ten years as CEO, Jean-David Blanc sold Allociné to Vivendi-Universal, which integrated it into Canal Numédia, the web subsidiary of Canal+. That same year, Allociné Vision was created, providing users with access to cinema-related programs, later evolving into Kiosque Ciné.

In April 2002, Allociné experienced two significant developments:

- Allociné Télévision, launched in September 2000 on CanalSatellite, merged with its competitor, Ciné Info, on April 26, 2002, under the name Allo Ciné Info (Allociné Télévision 50%, Ciné Info 50%). It was broadcast on TPS under this name until December 2002.
- Allociné was integrated into the Internet subsidiary of the Vivendi Universal group.

In September 2003, during the restructuring of the Vivendi Universal group, Allociné was sold and became independent again. By the following year, Allociné had returned to profitability despite incurring a loss of 4.5 million euros in 2003 while part of the Canal+ group. It was acquired by the French investment fund CITA (Compagnie d'investissement dans les technologies avancées) Gestion FCPR, created in 1985 by French and Kuwaiti financial institutions.

In 2005, Allociné expanded its information portal to include content on television series and launched a service in the United Kingdom at allocine.co.uk.

Allociné held a near-monopoly as a cinema portal, selling its content and services to generalist portals and mobile operators. It represented the development of a company in a "sector easy to dematerialize", such as cinema ticket sales, and the implementation of related multimedia strategies.

In October 2006, Allociné invested in Abricoo, an engineering company specializing in blogs and Web 2.0 applications.

In 2007, Allociné's website underwent a significant change in media broadcasting, moving from outdated Microsoft Windows Media/Real formats to Flash Video (Adobe), similar to YouTube and Dailymotion, including an improved user interface. Allociné continued its international development by launching a website in Germany (allocine.de).

Allociné was sold to Tiger Global, an American investment fund that acquired a majority stake in the company for an undisclosed amount. According to Le Figaro, the valuation reached 120 million euros. Claude Esclatine, formerly of France Télévisions, was appointed CEO.

In 2008, allocine.co.uk was rebranded as screenrush.co.uk. The service on Minitel was also discontinued.

In 2009, Allociné acquired a 34% stake in the cinema advertising agency Talent Group and purchased the German website filmstarts.de. A new version of Allociné was released on October 15.

=== 2010s ===
In February 2010, AlloCiné launched Alloclap, a phone-based information service providing details about ongoing film shoots marked with signage.

In May 2010, the company acquired the Turkish film website Beyazperde.com from the web portal mynet.com.

In 2011, the AlloCiné mobile app became available through French ISPs on their TV decoder boxes. On 5 September 2011, the company launched AlloCiné TV, a thematic cable and satellite channel available through Orange, Free, and Bouygues Telecom, later expanding to Canalsat, Numericable (20 September), and SFR (4 October). The channel focused on cinema, operated independently, and was supported by advertising. Programming included 24-hour broadcasts featuring film-related content, including 190 films and one hour of live programming per day. All content was produced by AlloCiné Productions.

Less than a year later, on 15 April 2012, AlloCiné TV ceased broadcasting.

In July 2013, 98% of AlloCiné was acquired by the French investment firm Fimalac for €66.9 million. The company was relocated to the offices of its new subsidiary, Webedia, which had been acquired two months earlier. Webedia also owns websites including Pure People, Pure Trend, and Pure Medias, and later acquired LeBonGuide.com, OverBlog, CanalBlog, jeuxvideo.com (in 2014), and Easyvoyage (in 2015). Over the following two years, more than two-thirds of AlloCiné employees either left or were laid off by the new management. Several legal cases were brought before the Paris labour court (Conseil de prud'hommes), which ruled in favour of the former employees.

In June 2014, AlloCiné partnered with Spotify, allowing users to stream movie soundtracks directly from film detail pages.

In November 2014, the corporate entity AlloCiné S.A. was dissolved, and its operations were fully absorbed by Webedia.

=== 2020s ===
In October 2020, the AlloCiné user forums were permanently closed.

== AlloCiné TV ==
AlloCiné TV was a thematic private television channel, distinct from the earlier Allociné Télévision. It was launched by the AlloCiné website on 5 September 2011.

The channel aired a mix of magazines, documentaries, and evening films spanning various genres. Programming ran 24/7 and focused on cinema news and behind-the-scenes content. The channel announced the broadcast of 190 films and one hour of live programming each evening. It was financed through advertising. All programming was produced by AlloCiné Productions.

On 18 October 2011, AlloCiné TV announced its candidacy for a TNT (digital terrestrial television) license in response to a call for applications by the CSA (French broadcasting regulator). However, on 9 January 2012, the channel withdrew its candidacy and continued broadcasting via cable and satellite.

On 15 April 2012, Tiger Global, AlloCiné's then-owner, decided to discontinue AlloCiné TV, ending its broadcast less than a year after its launch.

== AlloCiné Productions ==
AlloCiné Productions, the group's audiovisual production subsidiary established in 2011, remained operational after the channel's closure. It was overseen by Grégoire Lassalle (CEO), Frédéric Krebs (Deputy CEO), and Gabriel K. Sardet (creator/producer of Merci Qui?, Dedans AlloCiné, and Faux Raccord), who managed strategic and operational direction.

Thanks to this specialized unit, AlloCiné quickly positioned itself as a content creator for television channels and Gaumont Pathé cinemas. The company also produced content in advertising and fiction, including:

- Dedans AlloCiné – a series broadcast on AlloCiné and released on DVD/Blu-ray, which won an award at the La Rochelle international TV festival;
- LiliCorne – an award-winning short film in the United States;
- Les Ravis de la Crèche – produced for M6 (broadcast on Sixter and M6).

Despite AlloCiné's acquisition by Webedia, AlloCiné Productions retained its independence at the request of Grégoire Lassalle, who stepped down as AlloCiné president.

By 2014, AlloCiné Productions was managing around 20 original programs totaling over 700 episodes annually.

Until 2016, it was jointly managed by Lassalle and Sardet. After Sardet's departure, Lassalle assumed sole leadership. The company has not produced any new content since then.

== Global presence ==
AlloCiné has operated localized versions in several countries under different names:

Language	Country	Brand Name	Website	Launch	Closure
French	France	AlloCiné	https://www.allocine.fr	1997	Active
English	United Kingdom	Allociné / Screenrush	Formerly: allocine.co.uk / screenrush.co.uk	June 2005	December 2013
German	Germany	FilmStarts	https://www.filmstarts.de	2007	Active
Spanish	Spain	SensaCine	https://www.sensacine.com	2009	Active
Portuguese	Brazil	AdoroCinema	https://www.adorocinema.com	August 2011	Active
Turkish	Turkey	Beyazperde	https://www.beyazperde.com	2011	Active
Spanish	Mexico	SensaCine Mexico	https://www.sensacine.com.mx	Unknown	Active

== Community features ==
In addition to its film and television database, AlloCiné allowed users to register and post on public forums, share personal reviews, and create blogs linked to the site's database. Every film, actor, and director had a dedicated discussion space. As of September 2008, the forums included nearly 12 million messages across approximately 284,000 topics.

In 2008, the site launched the Club 300, a community of film and series contributors, many of whom were loyal users or external bloggers. Members received invitations to attend early screenings and exclusive events.

In January 2009, AlloCiné opened up its editorial platform to public contributions, starting with TV series and later including films. Users were able to add new pages to the database and enrich existing content.

== Programming ==
Originally focused on web content, AlloCiné (via AlloCiné Productions) created hundreds of TV episodes. These included:

- Plein 2 ciné – aired on France 2
- Face au film – aired on Ciné+
- Le Ciné de Luigi and Mercredi c'est... – aired on France 4
- Plan Séance – aired on Arte
- Cette semaine au cinéma – broadcast in Gaumont-Pathé cinemas

Other infotainment programs appeared on platforms like Canal Play, SFR, SFR Jeux à la Demande, and Bbox. On the web, several shows gained cult status, including:

- Faux Raccord
- FanZone
- La Minute
- Dedans AlloCiné
- Merci Qui?

Since 2018, AlloCiné has participated in the weekly show Le Récap Ciné on the live-streaming platform Lestream, owned by Webedia.

=== Notable programs ===
- Faux Raccord – Weekly show (launched 15 January 2010) about film continuity errors, hosted by Michel & Michel. A shorter version, Faux Raccord Reloaded, debuted in 2016.
- Top 5 – Daily countdown on various film-related topics.
- FanZone – Daily coverage of sagas, sequels, and superhero franchises. A real-time version launched in 2017.
- Ma scène préférée – Features celebrities discussing their favorite film scenes.
- Carnet de voyages – Filmed during major international film festivals.
- Face au film – Weekly debates between film crews and audience critics.
- Cinétrip – Monthly program exploring major filming locations around the world.
- Aviez-vous remarqué ? – Highlights small details in famous films.

AlloCiné also operated a webradio in partnership with Goom Radio.

=== Discontinued programs ===
- Game in Ciné – Covered video games adapted from or related to films.
- Direct to DVD – Biweekly show about direct-to-DVD releases.
- Tueurs en séries – Weekly series coverage, released Fridays.
- À l'affiche cette semaine – Weekly rundown of new releases on AlloCiné TV.
- Best Film Directors – Retrospectives on major American filmmakers; ended 9 March 2012.
- Bubbles – Enriched trailers featuring trivia and written commentary.
- Escale à Nanarland – Biweekly (later weekly) show highlighting "so-bad-it's-good" films, in partnership with Nanarland.
- Hollywood Boulevard – Focused on the careers of film stars.
- La Minute – Daily show about recent cinema news.
- Le Son de cinéma – Monthly then biweekly program covering movie soundtracks; ended 27 October 2012.
- Merci Qui? – Aired Mondays, Wednesdays, and Fridays (2008–2010); humorously presented film trivia. Ended 27 June 2010.
- On ramasse les copies! – Vox pop interviews of audiences post-screening.
- Parallèle Cannes – Daily during the 2010 Cannes Film Festival.
- Planète Ciné – Weekly roundup of internet and TV cinema clips; ended 27 July 2012.
- Plein 2 ciné – Weekly new releases show. Discontinued 17 October 2012, though it aired on France 2.
- Tapis rouge – Red carpet interviews during the 2012 Cannes Festival.
- Tout un programme – Daily TV programming guide show on AlloCiné TV.
- Dedans AlloCiné – Humorous weekly fiction set behind the scenes of AlloCiné.

== Traffic and revenue ==
As of December 2011, AlloCiné attracted 8.4 million monthly visitors in France, representing approximately 75% of traffic to cinema-focused websites in the country. Its closest competitor was Premiere.fr. AlloCiné distinguished itself by offering factual film information rather than reviews.

Internationally, the platform recorded 40 million monthly visitors across all its editions, making it the second-largest movie information portal globally behind IMDb.

In 2010, AlloCiné's revenue reached €25 million, of which 80% came from advertising. That same year, net profits totaled €2.6 million. By contrast, in 2003, two years after the dot-com bubble, the company generated €6 million in revenue but posted €7 million in losses, which prompted Vivendi to divest the company and reduce staff from 80 to 20 employees. In 2004, the site returned to profitability, and dividends paid to shareholders doubled in 2005, quadrupled in 2006, and increased sevenfold in 2007, before the sale to Tiger Global.

In 2015, Tiger sold AlloCiné to Webedia, which had been recently acquired by Fimalac. In 2016, AlloCiné ceased to exist as an independent company and became a brand operated by Webedia.

== Headquarters ==
AlloCiné's various offices have been located at:

- 29 Rue du Louvre, Paris, 2nd arrondissement
- 120 Avenue des Champs-Élysées, Paris, 8th arrondissement
- 3 Avenue Hoche, Paris 8, 8th arrondissement

Its current address is 2 Rue Paul-Vaillant-Couturier, Levallois-Perret, within Webedia's headquarters.

== Key people (as of January 2021) ==
- Véronique Morali – Chairwoman of the Supervisory Board (Fimalac)
- Cédric Siré – CEO, Webedia
- Julien Marcel – CEO, AlloCiné & The Boxoffice Company
- Yoann Sardet and Vincent Garnier – Co-editors-in-chief, AlloCiné

== See also ==
- Grégoire Lassalle
