= In My Wildest Dreams (disambiguation) =

In My Wildest Dreams is a 1994 Kenny Chesney album.

In My Wildest Dreams may also refer to:

- In My Wildest Dreams, a 1984 book by Leslie Thomas
- In My Wildest Dreams (Tom Grant album), 1992
- In My Wildest Dreams, a 1999 album by Ken Navarro
- "In My Wildest Dreams", a 1966 song by Freddy Cannon
- "In My Wildest Dreams", a song from E=MC² (1979)
- "In My Wildest Dreams", a song by Belinda Carlisle from the 1987 film Mannequin
- "In My Wildest Dreams", a song penned by Don Bruner of World5 in 2000
- "In My Wildest Dreams", a 2008 song by Gil Saunders

== See also ==
- My Wildest Dreams (TV series), a 1995 American sitcom centered on a mother who had fantasies of being a rock star
- My Wildest Dreams (album), the 2019 debut studio album by English singer-songwriter Claire Richards
- In Your Wildest Dreams (disambiguation)
- Wildest Dreams (disambiguation)
