= Wild Dreams =

Wild Dreams may refer to:

- Wild Dreams (Westlife album), 2021
- Wild Dreams (Joyce Yang album), 2014

== See also ==
- Wildest Dreams (disambiguation)
