= Anissa (song) =

Single by Wejdene

from the album 16
- Released: April 15, 2020
- Recorded: 2020
- Length: 2:55
- Label: Guette
- Songwriters: Feuneu; Wejdene
- Producer: Feuneu

Wejdene singles chronology
"Trahison" (2020)	"Anissa" (2020)	"Coco" (2020)

Music video
- Anissa on YouTube

"Anissa" is a song by French singer Wejdene, released on April 15, 2020. The music video was released on May 27, 2020 and has over 72 million views on YouTube. The song peaked at #3 on the French Singles Chart. The single Anissa was certified gold with over 15 million streams, and then it was certified platinum with the equivalent of 30 million streams. On 15 February 2021, the single was certified diamond with equivalent 80 billion streams.

== Writing and composition ==
The song is co-written by Feuneu and Wejdene. Feuneu was the producer of the single.

== Charts ==
=== Weekly charts ===
Chart (2020)	Peak position
Belgium (Ultratip Bubbling Under Flanders)	–
Belgium (Ultratop 50 Wallonia)	8
France (SNEP)	3
Switzerland (Schweizer Hitparade)	73

=== Year-end charts ===
Chart (2020)	Position
Belgium (Ultratop Wallonia)	97
France (SNEP)	25
