= National Music Publishers' Association =

American trade association

- Formation: 1917; 109 years ago
- Type: Trade association
- Headquarters: Washington, D.C., US
- Location: United States
- President and CEO: David Israelite
- Board of Directors: Jon Platt; Caroline Bienstock; Jody Gerson; Jake Wisely; Neil Gillis; Justin Kalifowitz; Golnar Khosrowshahi; Jody Klein; Chip McLean; Leeds Levy; Carianne Marshall; Ralph Peer, II; Laurent Hubert; Irwin Z. Robinson; Kenny MacPherson (Resigned October 2023); Keith Hauprich; Mike Molinar; Marti Cuevas; Liz Rose; Ross Golan
- Website: nmpa.org

The National Music Publishers' Association (NMPA) is a trade association for the American music publishing industry. Founded in 1917, NMPA represents American music publishers and their songwriting partners. The NMPA’s mandate is to protect and advance the interests of music publishers and songwriters in matters relating to the domestic and global protection of music copyrights.

The NMPA has pursued litigation against organizations including Amway, YouTube, Kazaa, LimeWire, Roblox, FullScreen including Napster and more.

== History ==
=== First half of the 20th century ===
The NMPA was founded in 1917 as the Music Publishers' Protective Association, seeking to end the practice of publishers having to pay vaudeville theaters for performing their music. The payola was said to have reached $400,000. The MPPA mandate went into effect May 7, 1917. Founding firms included:

- Broadway Music Corporation
- Joseph W. Stern & Co.
- Waterson, Berlin & Snyder, Inc.
- Al Piantadosi & Co.
- Leo Feist Co.
- T. B. Harms & Francis, Day & Hunter, Inc.
- Maurice Richmond (1880–1965)
- Jos. Morris Co.
- Charles K. Harris
- Harry Von Tilzer Co.
- Shapiro, Bernstein & Co.
- M. Witmark & Sons
- James Kendis (1883–1946)
- James Brockman
- Kalmar, Puck & Abrahams Consolidated, Inc. (Bert Kalmar, Harry Puck, Maurice W. Abrahams)
- F.J.A. Forster Co.
- McCarthy & Fisher
- A. J. Stasny Music Co.
- J.H. Remick & Co.
- Church, Paxson & Co.
- Karczag Publishing Company (Wilhelm Karczag; 1859–1923)
- William Jerome

In 1927, the NMPA founded the Harry Fox Agency, a mechanical rights collecting society.

=== Second half of the 20th century ===
In 1966 the name of the Music Publishers' Protective Association was changed to the National Music Publishers Association. The NMPA lobbies federal legislators and regulators on behalf of music publishers and crafted guidelines for the Copyright Act of 1976.

=== 21st century ===
In September 2001, the NMPA reached a settlement with Napster, turning the company into a fee-based service with publishers licensing music to the users. The NMPA won a judgment against peer-to-peer filing service StreamCast Networks in September 2006. In 2007, NMPA joined a lawsuit against YouTube for hosting user-generated videos containing music under copyright. The suit was dropped four years later.

Along with the Music Publishers Association (MPA), the NMPA has been responsible for taking many free guitar tablature web sites offline. NMPA President David Israelite asserted that "[u]nauthorised use of lyrics and tablature deprives the songwriter of the ability to make a living, and is no different than stealing". The NMPA also pushed for rate hikes for legal downloads of music in 2008.

In 2010, the NMPA represented EMI, Sony/ATV, Universal and Warner/Chappell, Bug, MPL Communications, Peermusic and the Richmond Organization in a lawsuit against LimeWire. The suit sought $150,000 for each song that was distributed.

NMPA is a member of the International Intellectual Property Alliance, a business alliance which amongst others publishes the Special 301 Report, a controversial list of countries that the coalition of copyright holders feel do not do enough to combat copyright infringements.

In 2015, the NMPA sold the Harry Fox Agency to SESAC.

In December 2016, the NMPA announced that it had reached an agreement with YouTube to allow the distribution of royalties for musical works used in videos on YouTube where ownership was previously unknown.

== See also ==
- Warner/Chappell Music Inc. v. Fullscreen Inc.
- Motion Picture Association of America
- Recording Industry Association of America
