= Jeuxvideo.com =

French video game website

- Website type: Video game journalism
- Available in: French
- Owner: Webedia
- Founders: Sébastien Pissavy, Jérôme Stolfo, François Claustres
- Managing director: Fabien Metsa
- General manager: Cédric Siré
- Website: jeuxvideo.com
- Commercial: Yes
- Launched: 1997; 29 years ago

JV (French: jeux vidéo; pronounced [ʒø video]; transl. video games; formerly Jeuxvideo.com and also called JVC) is a French website, and also available as an application, specializing in video games since 1997. It is built as an information tool intended for players by a team of editors and notably offers news, files, video game tests and video presentations. Editors travel to major global events, such as E3, Tokyo Game Show, Gamescom, Paris Games Week or IDEF to meet development teams and follow games throughout their life cycle, from development to commercialization.

== History ==
The website traces its history to a video game hint collection on Minitel, a precursor to the World Wide Web, and was founded by Sébastien Pissavy while on military service in 1995. As his work became more popular, he moved it to a website, Jeuxvideo.com, in 1997. Gameloft purchased an 80% share of the site in 2000, though Pissavy ran it independently until his departure in 2012. HiMedia purchased the site in 2006 and sold it in 2014 to Webedia for 90 million euros. Webedia subsequently moved the offices to Paris, causing several staff members to leave. In August 2015, the site was hacked; administrators said no private information was leaked but still advised users to change their passwords.

== Forums ==
Jeuxvideo.com's forums have caused it controversy and legal problems. The forums are often compared in spirit to 4chan and have few rules. L'Obs and Le Monde have both criticized the forums for their hatred and intolerance. The forums have been used to threaten school shootings and spread false rumors of suicide as a form of cyberbullying, as in the case of Amandine du 38. Forum posters have also uncovered controversies, such as making plagiarism claims against popular YouTube users.
