= World5 =

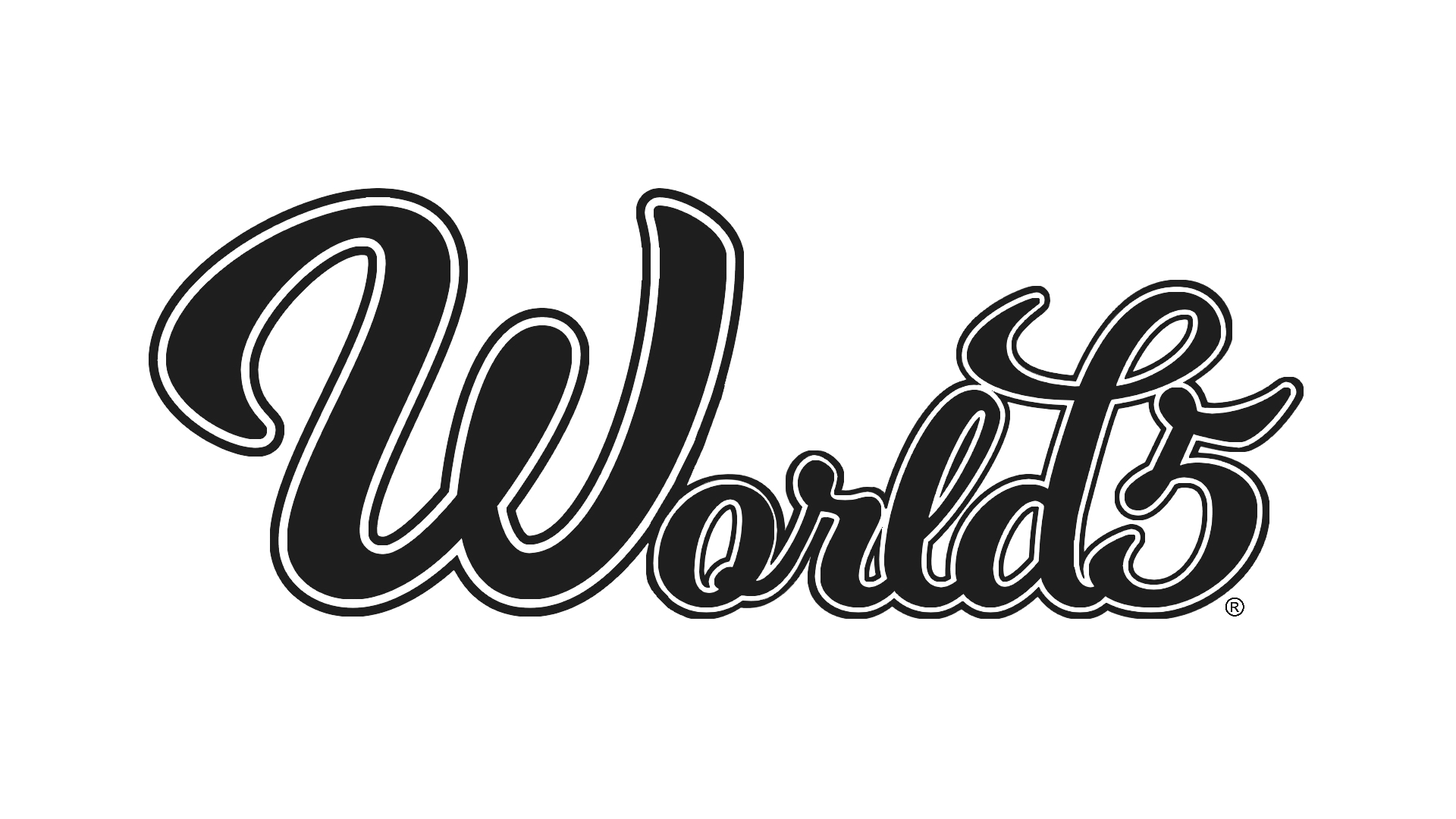

Background information
- Origin: Reno, Nevada
- Genres: Soft rock, pop, adult contemporary
- Years active: 2011–present
- Label: Spectra Music Group
- Members: Lou Evans; Steffen Goeres; Jimmy Olsson; Joe Gavito; Raimund Breitfeld
- Past members: Don Bruner; Roland Childs; Stephan Goessl; Pat Hunt; Randy Miller
- Website: World5Music.com

World5 is an adult contemporary rock band with five members based in the United States, New Zealand, and Sweden. Members include Lou Evans on vocals, Steffen Goeres on guitar, Jimmy Olsson on bass, Joe Gavito on guitar and Raimund Breitfeld on drums. Their debut single and album Global Experience were produced by Randy Miller, and released on Island Def Jam Digital Distribution, with the single released in December 2011 and the album in early 2012.

== History ==
=== Founding ===
World5 was formed as a soft rock and adult contemporary band by five friends who had previously performed together in different groups in the United States and Europe. The members had all settled in different locations and countries, but began writing songs together through Skype in 2011. Founder members are Don Bruner, from San Diego, California, on keyboards and lead vocals. Bruner had previously penned "In My Wildest Dreams" by Ruckus in 2000, and opened for groups including ZZ Top, Bay City Rollers, and Herman's Hermits. Roland Childs from San Francisco, California on bass, drummer Raimund Breitfeld contributes from Gothenburg, Sweden, Stephan Goessl began playing saxophone in Munich, Germany, and Steffen Goeres contributes guitars and trumpet from Wellington, New Zealand.

They were discovered by producer Randy Miller.

=== First releases ===
With Miller's patronage, the band began working on an album in 2011. Chiefly using Skype and digital recording facilities, the band began recording their individual parts at home. According to the band, they worked together on Skype to make the process work. Final tracks were sent to Randy Miller in Houston, Texas to be mixed into the album Global Experience.

Before the album was released, the single "You and I" was released to a number of websites and online radio stations, eventually finding rotation on approximately 60 international stations. It has a strong Latin aesthetic, and according to Miller, "I knew that 'You and I' was the single as soon as I heard it." It is the only song of the album to have a music video. On January 28, 2012 the track "You and I" reached #1 on a number of Internet charts. In January 2012, the band won the RGW Gold Award for the year.

Global Experience was released on May 1, 2012 on Island Def Jam Digital Distribution.

In early May 2012, the band had songs in the top five at iHeart Radio, and four songs in the top ten for the categories of Adult and Hit. The single "Bring Your Heart Home" debuted at top five in the Hit category of unsigned artists, and later reached #1 in the adult category. The song "Living (Give me a Reason)" debuted at #5 on the unsigned adult category, with the song "So Sincere" close behind.

In late May 2012, tracks from the album were included on the album Valleyarm Music Matters Sampler 2012, where it was presented at the music business conference "Music Matters" in Singapore.

In March 2013, the first single recorded with the new members Pat Hunt and Randy Miller, titled "Man Of Action" was released on Mondotunes distribution."Man Of Action" reached the National Airplay Top 200 Chart shortly after its release. The second single release on MondoTunes and titled "Maybe There´s a Way" followed June 2013."Heartbeat Of The World" was released in october 2013 under the label Famous Records Corp. / Fontana.

=== Style, reception ===
According to review by Indie Artist Radio, in July 11, 2012, the album has "wonderfully structured lyrics, melodically soothing harmonies, and soul grabbing rhythm that bites at the point just beneath the sternum that makes you want to sway uncontrollably into a dance that may just win you a place on Dancing With The Stars," and best fit in the genre Adult Contemporary Rock. It also compared the music of World5 to bands such as Bruce Hornsby and Mike and the Mechanics.

According to The Mountain Weekly, "A little bit or water and some jet lag didn’t stop the guys from getting together to make soulful rock and roll reminiscent of Bryan Adams or early Genesis....Anyone who likes Jimmy Buffett or island music is surely going to appreciate the harmonies and guitar work." The album received 7/10 stars from the Raffo Review, which said "Overall this record is one for those lazy, chilled out Sundays all the way up to a cocktail party. I found myself enjoying its smooth melodies and catchy grooves." Another review called them "a sophisticated brand of Adult Orientated Pop/Rock" that was reminiscent of Toto and Yes.

The single "You and I" was named as a 2012 favorite single by Michael Damian.

== Current members ==
- Lou Evans - lead vocals, guitars
- Steffen Goeres - guitars, trumpet
- Joe Gavito - guitars, keyboards, background vocals
- Raimund Breitfeld Sailon - drums, percussion
- Jimmy Olsson - bass

== Discography ==
=== Albums ===
- 2012: Global Experience
- 2016: Heartbeat of the World
- 2024: 3

=== Singles ===
- 2011: "You and I"
- 2013: "Man of Action"
- 2013: "Maybe There's a Way"
- 2013: "Heartbeat of the World"
- 2014: "I Promise You"
- 2019: "Be You"
