= Fullscreen (company) =

American entertainment company (2011–2021)

Fullscreen, LLC
- Type: Subsidiary
- Predecessor: Machinima, Inc.
- Founded: January 2011; 15 years ago
- Founder: George Strompolos
- Defunct: October 31, 2021; 5 years ago
- Fate: Folded into Ellation
- Successor: Ellation
- Headquarters: Los Angeles, California, U.S.
- Key people: George Strompolos (advisor)
- Parent: Otter Media (2014–2021)
- Website: fullscreen.com

Fullscreen, Inc. was an American entertainment company which offered software tools, services, and consultation to social media content creators and brands. It was an original multi-channel network on YouTube. It was fully acquired for $845M in 2018 by AT&T-owned Otter Media, which is now a subsidiary of Warner Bros. Discovery.

Fullscreen also provided channel management and optimization services for brands and media companies to grow their presence on social media. Fullscreen's clients included NBCUniversal, Mattel, Fox, Fremantle, JASH, Fine Brothers Entertainment, and more.

== History ==
Fullscreen was founded in January 2011 by CEO George Strompolos. Strompolos hired Ezra Cooperstein as Fullscreen's COO.

Peter Chernin was a strategic partner and advisor since Fullscreen's inception. In May 2011, the Chernin Group officially came on board as an investor. In the fall of 2014, the Chernin Group and AT&T's Otter Media acquired a controlling stake of Fullscreen, aligning with Otter Media's focus on youth media.

In 2014, Fullscreen acquired the companies ScrewAttack and Rooster Teeth. ScrewAttack now operates as a division of Rooster Teeth, continuing their Death Battle and Top10 series. In May 2015, Fullscreen acquired social media creative agency McBeard.

That same year, Fullscreen rebranded itself as Fullscreen Media, consisting of three separate businesses: Fullscreen Creator Network, a management service that works with established and up-and-coming creators; Fullscreen Entertainment, which comprises Fullscreen Live, its subsidiary studio Rooster Teeth, Fullscreen Productions and its original subscription service; and Fullscreen Brandworks, a unit dedicated to branded content run by former Razorfish CEO Pete Stein. In November 2015, Andy Forssell joined the company as COO.

In 2016, Fullscreen launched a subscription video on demand app. In addition to Roku, the subscription service was available for iPhone, iPad, Apple TV, Android phones and tablets, and Google Chromecast devices and was also available via Amazon Channels. The app was available as a free trial to people who have AT&T.

Aside from the talent network, Fullscreen's Video Labs team works with brands and entertainment companies to help them become more successful on YouTube. In September 2016, Fullscreen subsidiary McBeard acquired Video Labs, rounding out the social offerings for the company to include social creative, insights, optimization, and distribution for clients.

Fullscreen is also partnering with Mattel to create its own social influencer network, the first of which will be The Hot Wheels Network.

On November 14, 2017, Fullscreen announced the closure of their video on-demand service as of January 2018.

On April 4, 2018, Fullscreen acquired the influencer marketing firm Reelio

On January 26, 2018, Ezra Cooperstein left Fullscreen for Rooster Teeth, becoming their president.

On September 7, 2018, in a memo to all Fullscreen employees, George Strompolos announced he would be stepping down from the company as CEO and moving into an advisory role.

On February 1, 2019, Machinima, Inc. merged into Fullscreen, laying off its 81 employees and ceased all operations.

On August 11, 2020, Jukin Media announced partnerships with Fullscreen and BroadbandTV to provide their rosters of influencers and YouTubers exclusive discounts to Jukin's library, dedicated customer support, and early access to new features.

On November 10, 2020, WarnerMedia laid off most or all of the Fullscreen team as part of a company-wide reorganization.

== Initiatives ==
On November 30, 2012, Fullscreen launched their Million Dollar Creator Fund committing one million dollars' worth of advertising and promotion to their creators. Every month, four channels within the Fullscreen network will be awarded up to $10,000 in pre-roll advertising and guerilla campaigns, in which Fullscreen will pay its other partners to promote the winning channels.

Fullscreen's LGBTQ-pride programming kicked off with the season 2 premiere of Hella Gay with Miles McKenna, featuring Miles McKenna, on June 1 with three back-to-back episodes.

== Original programs ==
- Shane and Friends
- Not Too Deep with Grace Helbig
- Filthy Preppy Teen$
- Dr. Havoc's Diary
- Zall Good with Alexis G. Zall
- Electra Woman and Dyna Girl
- The Deleted
- Magic Funhouse!
- Celebs React
- CEO @ 16
- The Outfield
- The What's Underneath Project
- Explain Things to Me
- Kingdom Geek
- Party in the Back
- Single and Swiping
- Ladybits with Lauren Giraldo
- The Drop with Greyson Chance
- Present Tense with Jillian Rose Reed
- Apologies in Advance with Andrea Russett
- Shan Boody Is Your Perfect Date
- The Minutes Collection
- Hella Gay with Miles McKenna
- Psychobabble with Tyler Oakley & Korey Kuhl
- Goat Rodeo with Cody Ko
- Jack and Dean of All Trades
- Fullscreen's The Search For The Holy Fail
- Search Bar with Anna Akana & Brad Gage
- Goin Raw with Timothy DeLaGhetto
- Wildcats: The Series with Linnea Sage
- Unzipped with Lizzie Velasquez
- Cassandra French's Finishing School
- Shay Mitchell: Chapters
- H8ters with Kian and JC
- About To Break with Hey Violet
- The Basement Yard with Joe Santagato'
- Clickbait with SSSniperWolf

== See also ==
- Warner/Chappell Music Inc. v. Fullscreen Inc.
- Multi-channel network
- YouTube
- List of multi-channel networks
- List of YouTubers
