= AdoroCinema =

Brazilian film site

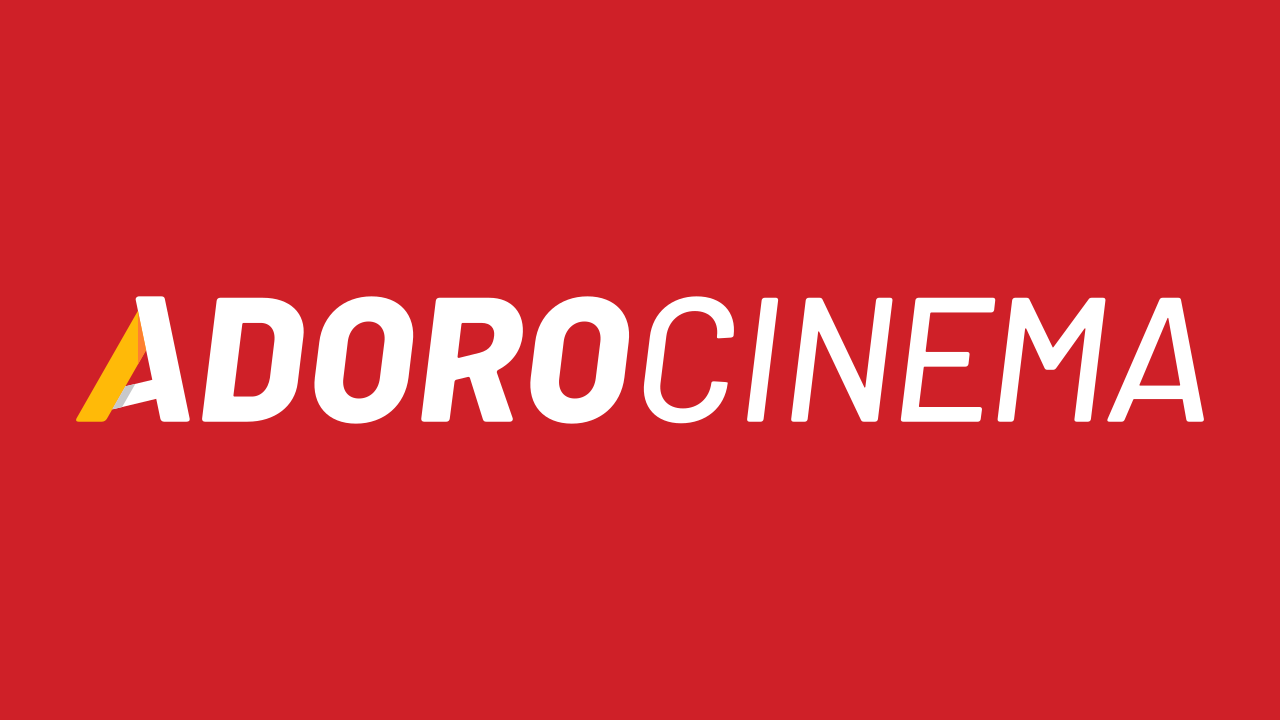
- Logo used since 2019
- Website type: Entertainment portal
- Available in: Portuguese
- Country of origin: Brazil
- Owner: Webedia
- Website: www.adorocinema.com
- Commercial: No
- Registration: Optional - Free
- Launched: April 1, 2000; 26 years ago
- Current status: Active
- Ranked 110 in Brazil per Alexa

AdoroCinema is a Brazilian entertainment website focused on movies, TV series, and cinema-related content. Launched in 2000, it serves as a platform for film enthusiasts in Brazil, offering movie reviews, news, trailers, showtimes, and celebrity profiles.

== History ==
AdoroCinema was established in 2000 in Brazil. In August 2011, French mediatech Webedia became the owner of AdoroCinema, which owns AlloCiné, becoming a subsidiary of the French group in Brazil. In 2013, it became part of FIMALAC after Webedia was acquired by the capital fund for 140 million euros.

The website covers both domestic and international films and is part of Webedia’s portfolio of digital media properties.

== Features ==
The website offers a variety of features, including:

- Movie and TV database: detailed information on films, including synopses, cast, crew, and release dates.
- Reviews: critiques from users and professional critics, along with audience ratings for movies and TV shows.
- News and Interviews: articles on the entertainment industry, including interviews with actors and filmmakers.
- Showtimes: cinema schedules for major cities in Brazil.
- Trailers and videos: Movie trailers, behind-the-scenes footage, and related video content.

=== Operations and reach ===
AdoroCinema, operated by Webedia, reports an average of 12 million unique monthly visitors.
