= In Your Wildest Dreams =

In Your Wildest Dreams may refer to:

- "In Your Wildest Dreams" (song), a song by Tina Turner and Barry White
- In Your Wildest Dreams (EP), an EP by Whiskeytown
- "In Your Wildest Dreams", a song by The Reverend Horton Heat from Liquor in the Front

== See also ==
- "Your Wildest Dreams", a song by The Moody Blues from the album The Other Side of Life
- Wildest Dreams (disambiguation)
- In My Wildest Dreams (disambiguation)
