= Coco (Wejdene song) =

2020 single by Wejdene

Single by Wejdene

from the album 16
- Released: 19 August 2020
- Length: 3:41
- Label: Guette
- Songwriter(s): Mehdi Nine; Wejdene; Feuneu; Big Tom; Davyone; Chulo
- Producer(s): Loxon; Chichi; Feuneu

Wejdene singles chronology
"Anissa" (2020)	"Coco" (2020)	"16" (2020)

Music video
- "Coco" on YouTube

"Coco" is a song by French singer, Wejdene, released on 19 August 2020 from her debut album 16.

== Charts ==
=== Weekly charts ===
Chart (2020)	Peak position
Belgium (Ultratop 50 Wallonia)	28
France (SNEP)	3
Switzerland (Schweizer Hitparade)	81

=== Year-end charts ===
Chart (2020)	Position
France (SNEP)	90
