= David Israelite =

American music executive

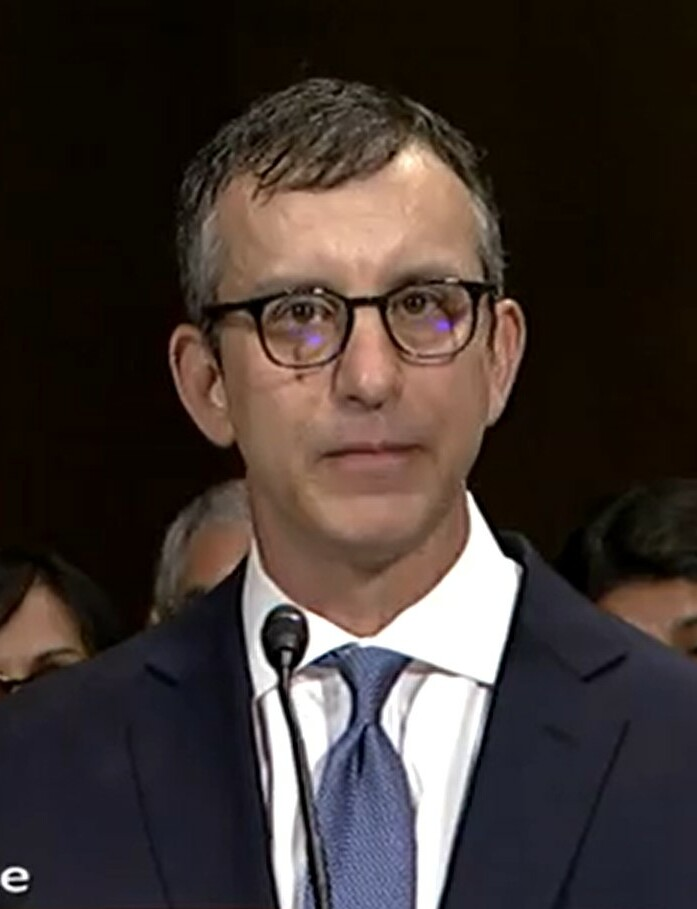
- Israelite in 2018
- Occupation: corporate executive
- Employer: National Music Publishers' Association

David Israelite is an American music executive. He has been president of the National Music Publishers Association since 2005.

He was previously an aide to John Ashcroft, the Attorney General and was chairman of the intellectual property task force of the United States Department of Justice.

He was a chief of staff and campaign manager for Kit Bond, a senator from Missouri.

Israelite is number 42 on the Billboard Power 100 list.

Israelite led and organized the music industry effort to negotiate and support the passage of the landmark Music Modernization Act which was signed into law by President Donald Trump on October 11, 2018. The bill modernizes Copyright Law to improve how songwriters and music publishers are paid by streaming services.

David also led the Copyright Royalty Board trial in 2017 on behalf of music publishers and songwriters resulting in a raise of songwriters mechanical royalty rates by over 44%.
