= Wejdene =

French singer-songwriter

Background information
- Born: 23 April 2004 (age 22); Saint-Denis, Seine-Saint-Denis, France
- Genres: R&B; urban pop
- Instrument: Voice
- Years active: 2019–present
- Labels: Guette Music; Caroline (UMG)

Wejdene Chaïb (born 23 April 2004), known by her mononym Wejdene, is a French singer of Tunisian heritage. She rose to fame in 2020 with her single "Anissa", a success on TikTok among other social media platforms.

== Career ==
Her first album, 16, was released on 25 September 2020.

On 16 December 2022, she released the album Glow Up. In February 2024, she released the EP W.

== Discography ==
=== Albums ===
Title	Details	Peak positions				Certifications
Title	Details	FRA	BEL (Fl)	BEL (Wa)	SWI	Certifications
16	Released: 25 September 2020; Label: Universal Music France; Formats: Digital download, streaming	3	68	7	34	SNEP: Platinum
Glow Up	Released: 16 December 2022; Label: Universal Music France; Formats: Digital download, streaming	106	—	—	—	

=== EPs ===
Title	Details	Peak positions
Title	Details	BEL (Wa)
W	Released: 9 February 2024; Label: Virgin Music France; Formats: Digital download, streaming	198

=== Singles ===
Title	Year	Peak chart positions			Certifications	Album
Title	Year	FRA	BEL (Wa)	SWI	Certifications	Album
"J'attends"	2019	—	—	—		Non-album singles
"J'peux dead"	2019	—	—	—		Non-album singles
"Trahison" (with Larsé)	2019	—	—	—		Non-album singles
"Anissa"	2020	3	8	73	SNEP: Diamond	16
"Coco"	2020	3	28	73	SNEP: Platinum	16
"Je t'aime de ouf"	2020	7	41	75	SNEP: Platinum	16
"Réfléchir "	2020	7	—	—	SNEP: Gold	16
"16"	2020	7	—	—	SNEP: Gold	16
"Ciao"	2020	33	—	—		16
"Miel"	2020	39	—	—		16
"Nananeh"	2020	40	—	—		16
"+33"	2020	48	—	—		16
"Arrogante"	2020	67	—	—		16
"Indifférent"	2020	76	—	—		16
"Souvenir"	2020	81	—	—		16
"Vie d'a"	2020	90	—	—		16
"Ta Gow"	2021	3	8	73		16
"La Meilleure"	2022	52	—	—		Non-album singles
"Re"	2022	—	—	—		Non-album singles
"Poto"	2022	—	—	—		Glow Up
