= Boxoffice Pro =

American film industry magazine

- Publisher: The Boxoffice Company (Webedia subsidiary)
- Founded: 1920
- Company: Webedia
- Country: United States
- Based in: Ridgefield, Connecticut
- Language: English
- Website: www.boxofficepro.com
- ISSN: 0006-8527
- OCLC: 801242395

Boxoffice Pro is a film industry magazine dedicated to the movie theatre business published by The Boxoffice Company (Webedia), through BoxOffice Media LP.

== History ==
It started in 1920 as The Reel Journal, taking the name Boxoffice in 1931 and still publishes today, with an intended audience of theatre owners and film professionals. In 2019, its name was changed to Boxoffice Pro.

Boxoffice Pro is the official publication of the National Association of Theatre Owners, a role it took on in 2006. In 1937 the magazine began to publish box office reports; it ended its publication of movie reviews in 2012.

The magazine was originally published every Saturday by Associated Publications. Box office performance was expressed as a percentage of normal performance with normal being expressed as 100%. A Barometer issue was published in January with a review of the year including the performance of movies for the year.

Boxoffice was acquired by the French group Webedia in 2015.
