= Moviepilot =

Online magazine covering the film industry

- Website type: Online magazine
- Available in: English
- Website: moviepilot.com
- Launched: 2007; 19 years ago

Moviepilot (stylized Movie Pilot) was a fan-centric online magazine covering the film industry. Its content was written predominantly by an in-house team of staff writers, with additional articles from contributors known as Creators.

== History ==
Movie Pilot was launched by three co-founders Tobi Bauckhage, Jon Handschin, and Ben Kubota in 2007, as a Berlin-based film website that also offered social media consulting services to film studios. Using an open-posting model that invites readers to write their own content and a recommendation algorithm for movies, moviepilot.de grew to more than 6.8 million unique monthly views by October 2014 (Google Analytics).

Since its launch Movie Pilot expanded into other publishing verticals like Now Loading (a site for gamers) and Champions (an MMA fan site). In December 2015 Movie Pilot announced a formal rename of the company to Creators Media, Inc., a parent company that housed all their media brands.

As of 2014, based in Venice, California, Creators Media, Inc. employed approximately 100 employees worldwide.

In December 2017 Paris-based publishing group Webedia acquired majority control of Creators Media, the L.A.-based company that ran entertainment fan site Movie Pilot and video channel Super News covering nerd culture.

== Contributor platform ==
Movie Pilot's publishing power came in part through an open posting platform model that afforded fans the opportunity to create their own content similar to Wordpress, but with distribution to a network of millions. As the platform grew and fans expressed their desire to expand their writing into other genres, like Video Gaming and MMA, Creators.co was launched in February 2016. Creators.co was the open web platform where fans created, communicated, and collaborated on all things entertainment and pop culture.

Creators Media rewarded contributors with access to press events, celebrity interviews, and a revenue sharing model for Verified Creators who had gone through a verification process.

== Media brands ==
=== Moviepilot.com ===
MoviePilot was the first publishing brand created by Creators Media founders Tobi Bauckhage, Jon Handschin, and Ben Kubota. Started in 2007 in Germany, MoviePilot.com covered entertainment news around movies, films, and pop culture. According to Quantcast, Moviepilot averaged more than 60 million views per month and more than 15 million unique views, second only to IMDb for film websites. Movie Pilot also posted selected stories through their multi-channel Facebook platform; their 15 channels totalled more than 32 million likes on Facebook, with "MoviePilot Horror" and "MoviePilot Vampires" tallying the highest marks (5.4m and 3.95m, respectively). Across these multiple Facebook channels MoviePilot had a monthly social reach of over 300M shares.

=== NowLoading.co ===
NowLoading was a millennial focused gaming publisher. It ran off of the same fan-focused creator model that Moviepilot.com was built on in 2012, gathering content from both staff and fans. Top game fans provided gaming reviews, tricks and tips, Facebook Live game play, release news.

=== Champions.co ===
MoviePilot's MMA vertical, Champions, provided coverage of UFC fighting. Through the creators.co platform used by Movie Pilot and Now Loading, UFC fighters were regular contributors to the site. Fans contributed content about the biggest fights, comebacks, and behind the scenes stories.

=== PlaySource.co ===
PlaySource launched in 2017, as a destination for getting involved at the ground level with upcoming indie games, both the video and tabletop variety. It was much more than a site for reading news and discovering new games. PlaySource was all about connecting the player with the creators of new games, featuring fans' content about the game.
