= Wildest Dreams (disambiguation) =

"Wildest Dreams" is a 2015 song by American singer-songwriter Taylor Swift, which was later covered by Ryan Adams.

Wildest Dreams may also refer to:

== Theater and television ==
- Wildest Dreams (play), a 1991 play by Alan Ayckbourn
- Wildest Dreams (TV series), a 2009 UK reality series
- "Wildest Dreams" (The Flash), a 2023 episode of The Flash

== Music ==
- Wildest Dreams, a 1960 musical by Julian Slade
- Wildest Dreams Tour, a 1996–1997 concert tour by Tina Turner

=== Albums ===
- Wildest Dreams (Tina Turner album), 1996
- Wildest Dreams (John Berry album), 1999
- Wildest Dreams (Saga album), 1987
- Wildest Dreams (Majid Jordan album), 2021
- Wildest Dreams (Nadine Lustre album), 2020

=== Songs ===
- "Wildest Dreams" (Iron Maiden song), 2003
- "Wildest Dreams" (Brandy song), 2012
- "Wildest Dreams", by Asia from Asia
- "Wildest Dreams", by Dolly Parton from Eagle When She Flies
- "Wildest Dreams", by Ten from The Name of the Rose
- "Wildest Dreams", by Tom Cochrane from Ragged Ass Road

== See also ==
- The Wildest Dream, a documentary film about the British climber George Mallory
- "Your Wildest Dreams", a song by The Moody Blues, 1986
- In Your Wildest Dreams (disambiguation)
- In My Wildest Dreams (disambiguation)
- "Beyond My Wildest Dreams", a song from the Mark Knopfler and Emmylou Harris album All the Roadrunning
