= Shahrzad Rafati =

Iranian Canadian entrepreneur

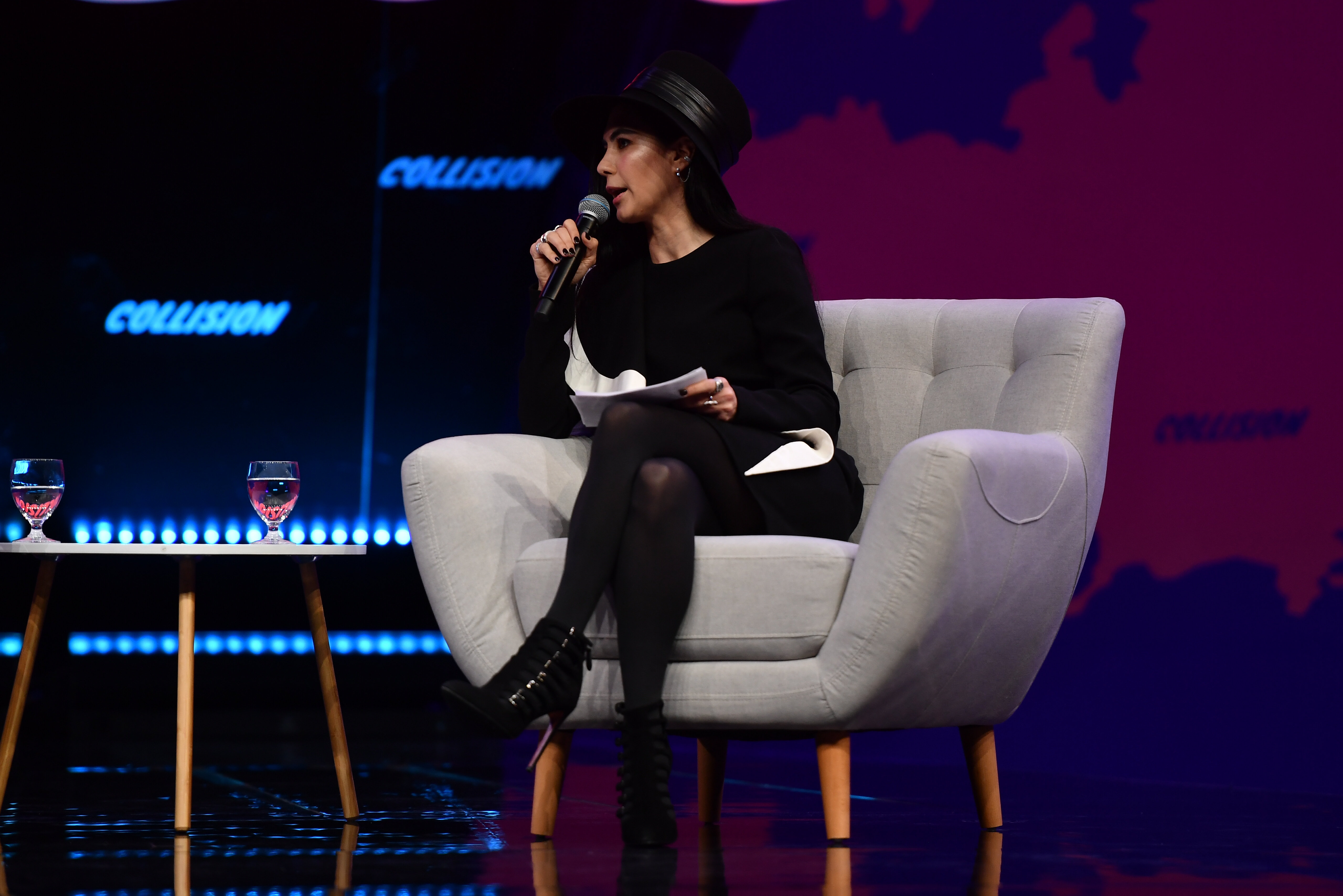
- Rafati in 2019
- Born: 1979 (age 46–47); Tehran, Iran
- Education: University of British Columbia (BSc)
- Occupations: Chairperson & CEO, RHEI

Shahrzad Rafati is an Iranian-Canadian Chairwoman and CEO of RHEI, formerly BBTV, – a global tech company headquartered in Vancouver, Canada, which develops AI solutions for content creators and media companies, including its "emotionally intelligent" Made platform, and data licensing solution, RHEI Data Pro.

== Early life ==
Rafati was born 1979 in Tehran, Iran and immigrated to Vancouver, British Columbia, Canada as a teenager. In 2005, she completed her BSc in computer science at the University of British Columbia. Rafati also studied French at Université Paris Sorbonne (Paris IV), and is a graduate of the Young Global Leaders Oxford Module: Transformational Leadership at Saïd Business School, University of Oxford. Shahrzad also received her Honorary Doctorate from University Canada West in 2020.

== Career ==
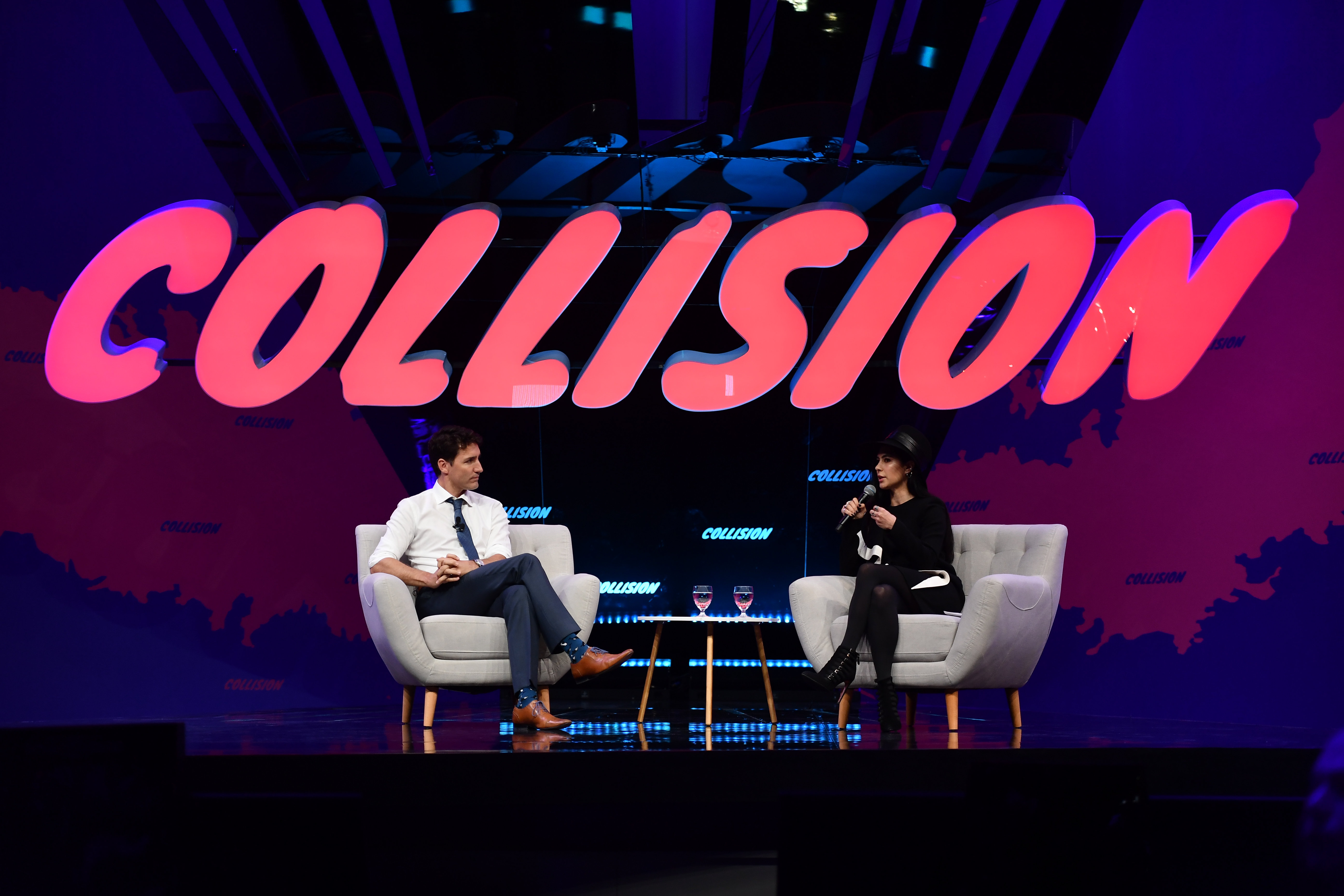
Rafati and Justin Trudeau at Collision conference in Toronto in 2019

Separate from her role as a CEO of RHEI, Rafati is also a board member for Bjarke Ingels Group, an architecture firm, and was named Vice Chair of the board for Invest in Canada in 2019. She has been a board member of the Vancouver Economic Commission, and the Forum for Women Entrepreneurs.

In September 2018, it was announced that Shahrzad was appointed by Prime Minister Justin Trudeau to represent Canada on the Business Women Leaders task force, which was formed to advise global leaders on issues of women's economic empowerment as part of the G20 Summit. She was later appointed as Canada's representative for G20 EMPOWER, a private sector alliance with the goal of advancing women's representation at leadership levels in the private sector.

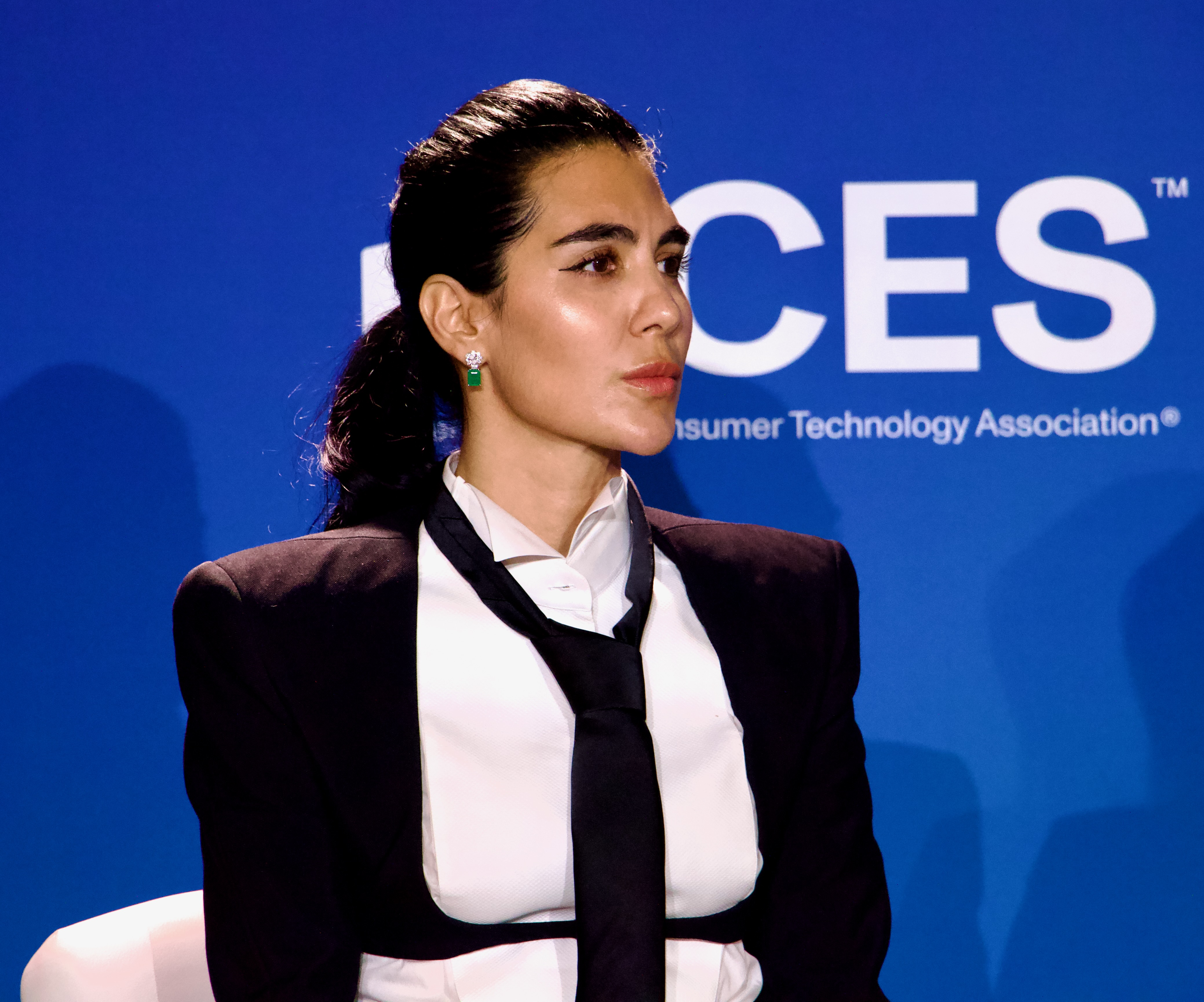
Rafati at Consumer Electronics Show 2025

In 2019 she was also appointed as the Vice Chair of Invest in Canada, a federal agency that aims to create jobs in Canada by facilitating foreign business investment by highlighting Canada's talent pool, economic growth across multiple industries, and geographic advantage as a hub for global trade. In January 2025, Rafati was also appointed by the Prime Minister to the Council on US-Canada Relations.

== Awards ==
- 2020: CanadianSME Magazine, Business Woman of the Year
- 2019: AdAge Creativity Awards, Visionary/Founder of The Year
- 2018: Ernst & Young, Entrepreneur of the Year, Pacific, Technology Category
- 2018: Canadian Innovation Awards Winner - Entrepreneur
- 2017: Canada's Most Powerful Women: Top 100 Award Winner - Hall of Fame
- 2017: Canada's Top 40 under 40
- 2016: Hollywood Reporter's 20 Most Powerful Women in Global Television, Person of the Year by BC Technology Association, TheWrap's Innovator List
- 2015: Variety's Power of Women list,
- 2014: Digital Life Design (DLD), Munich, Germany, panelist: Digital Storytelling: Surfing the Video Explosion (January 2014)
- 2013: Digi Awards, Executive of The Year (December 2013)
- 2013: Canada's Most Powerful Women: Top 100™ Award Winner in the Sun Life Financial Arts & Communications category (December 2013)
- 2013: Ernst & Young, Pacific Emerging Entrepreneur of the Year (October 2013)
- 2013: Business In Vancouver, CEO of The Year (October 2013)
- 2012: 40 Under 40 Business in Vancouver (December 2012)
- 2011: Fast Company's 100 Most Creative People in Business (2011)

== See also ==
- List of Iranian businesswomen
