= Gry-Online =

Polish video game website

- Website type: Electronic entertainment
- Available in: Polish: Gry-Online
- Owner: Gry-Online S.A.
- Website: www.gry-online.pl
- Commercial: Yes
- Registration: Optional
- Launched: 1 January 2001

Gry-Online is a group of Polish websites devoted to computer games and electronic entertainment. Founded by Mariusz Klamra, Wojciech Antonowicz and Rafał Swaczyna, the group has grown to include GRYOnline.pl, TVGry.pl, Gameplay.pl, and Gamepressure. In 2017, the German branch of the French publisher Webedia Group bought Gry-OnLine from Empik, thereby entering the Polish market.

The group won the 2010 Wings of Business award in the category of "Micro-reliable and dynamic company".

== GRYOnline.pl ==
The paramount member of the group is the website GRYOnline.pl, which was launched 1 January 2001, and has undergone numerous overhauls and redesigns since. Its editor-in-chief is currently Krystian "U.V. Impaler" Smoszna. The position was formerly occupied by Borys "Shuck" Zajączkowski and Łukasz "Verminus" Malik.

GRYOnline.pl publishes information and articles about video games for PC, Xbox (360, Xbox One and Xbox Series X/S), PlayStation (PlayStation Vita, PlayStation Portable, PlayStation 3, PlayStation 4 and PlayStation 5), Nintendo (Switch, Wii, Wii U and 3DS), as well as mobile platforms (Android and iOS). In the past, the scope of journalist activities also included the original Xbox, GameCube, PlayStation 2, Game Boy Advance, and Windows Phone.

=== History of GRYOnline.pl ===
The roots of GRYOnline.pl reach as far back as mid-2000, when the company Gry-Online sp. z o.o. was first registered. Its originators and founders were Mariusz Klamra, Wojciech Antonowicz and Rafał Swaczyna, and the co-creators were Janusz Burda and Tomasz Pyzioł. The Internet service that was launched on 1 January 2001 was subsequently joined by Przemysław Bartula, Michał Bobrowski and Marcin Hajek.

=== Games Encyclopedia ===
The core of GRYOnline.pl is the Games Encyclopedia, which includes descriptions, photos, videos, release dates, hardware requirements, PEGI ratings and technical requirements for over 26,337 game groups (as of 8 November 2023). This section of the website also includes game rankings, a catalogue of video games developers and publishers, as well as a gallery of screenshots and concept art from the encyclopedia's titles. The Encyclopedia is also linked with the GOL Video section – a collection of video materials concerning computer games (trailers, announcements, gameplays, interviews with artists, etc.).

=== Guides ===
GRYOnline.pl publishes video game guides, which include walkthrough, maps, sets of achievements, and advice. The guides are illustrated with screens, graphic diagrams, and occasionally also with short videos.

=== News outlet ===
The information service consists mainly of the newsroom – a section where information about games, equipment, films and TV series is published on a daily basis. Additionally, the service includes reviews, previews and editorial pieces devoted to games, studios and major events in the industry.

== Gamepressure ==
In 2005, a parallel English version of the GRYOnline.pl, called Gamepressure.com, was launched. The website features content translated from Polish, with occasional, dedicated articles. The focus of Gamepressure is creating guides and walkthroughs to video games, which can be accessed on the website; some are also distributed via Steam. The website also offers a news outlet, access to an encyclopedia of games that contains over 26,000 entries, a download section, and a section with free-to-play games.

The website has been growing in popularity, eventually surpassing its sister site, GRYOnline.pl. The headquarters of both these websites are located in Kraków. Gamepressure is operated by about 20 people.

== tvgry.pl ==
In 2009, a few members of the editorial team of GRYOnline.pl were assigned to a team focused around the sub-site tvgry.pl, conceived as an internet television for gamers. Over the years, the team has become increasingly independent, and included such prominent figures of the Polish gaming and vlog communities as Krzysztof Gonciarz, Maciej "Von Zay" Makuła, Marcin "Del" Łukański, Remigiusz "Rock" Maciaszek, Patryk "Rojo" Rojewski or Grzegorz "Gambrinus" Bobrek. Michał „Elessar" Mańka is the current editor-in-chief. Today, the leading area of activity of tvgry.pl is YouTube, where content is published through three channels: TVGRYpl, TVGRYplus and TvFilmy. The team regularly organizes live broadcasts on Twitch (as tvgrypl).

== Views ==
According to Alexa.com, the gry-online.pl domain is ranked 112 among the most popular websites in Poland, and 7,823 worldwide (as of 5 February 2019), and Gamepressure is ranked 4,306 worldwide. The TVGRYpl YouTube channel has over 930,000 subscribers, and its materials were viewed over 460 million times (as of 17 March 2019). At the beginning of 2018, the channel had around 600,000 subscribers, and over 400,000 a year before.

== Awards and achievements ==
In December 2013, GRYOnline.pl was on the list of the most popular thematic portals in Poland, taking the 20th place in the Culture and Entertainment category. GRY-OnLine S.A. also won the Golden Certificate of Business Credibility for 2009 from the credit bureau Bisnode D&B Polska and a distinction in the ranking of Business Wings 2010 in the category "Micro - reliable and dynamic company" in the Małopolskie Voivodeship. In the 2012 Trusted Opinions Ranking organised by Ceneo.pl, the GRY-OnLine store was ranked among the top ten most trusted online stores.

Throughout its history, GRYOnline.pl has also been awarded four times and received several distinctions in the Webstarfestival, a competition for the best websites and creations on the Polish Internet:

- 2005 - distinction in the Choice of Internet users category.
- 2006 - distinction in the Culture and Entertainment category.
- 2007 - Internet Users Webstar in the Culture and Entertainment category.
- 2008 - Academy Webstar and Internet Users Webstar in the Entertainment category.
- 2009 - Second award in the Entertainment category.
- 2010 - Academy Webstar in the Entertainment category.
