= Amandine du 38 =

French amateur rapper

- Born: Amandine Rollin; Villefontaine, Isère, France
- Other names: Miss Amanda; Miss Sing
- Occupation: Amateur rapper
- Years active: 2008–2010
- Known for: Viral videos
- Notable work: "École au Sénégal"

Amandine Rollin (French pronunciation: [amɑ̃din ʁɔlɛ̃]), known online as Amandine du 38 or Miss Amanda, is a French amateur singer from Villefontaine whose rap videos went viral in January 2009. Her videos were ridiculed and she faced harassment, which led her to drop out of school. In March 2010, she tried to release a crowdfunded album under the name Miss Sing.

== Career ==
In December 2008, at age 18, Rollin uploaded a rap video online called "École au Sénégal" (School in Senegal) about poverty in Senegal under the name Miss Amanda. She wanted to get tips on how to improve her rapping. The video was noticed by the radio show Le 6/9 from NRJ, which mocked her amateur rapping. The video went viral in January 2009. Those who mocked Miss Amanda gave her the nickname "Amandine du 38" in reference to the French department number of her native Isère. She became a victim of harassment (teasing, insults, death threats, suicide rumours) both on the internet and in person. Many videos were published online mocking her, encouraged by French radio stations such as NRJ, Ado FM or the regional radio RMG 38. Although her school and her parents advised her to stop sharing videos, especially since her sister and brother were also being harassed at school, she kept on uploading new songs as well as videos responding to her harassers. A few months later, fed up with being asked to rap between classes, she finally gave up making videos for a few months and dropped out of school.

=== Attempt to release an album ===
In March 2010, Rollin returned with new songs under the name Miss Sing. She attempted to release an album in the crowdfunding record label MyMajorCompany, but failed to reach the required amount. She was still being harassed online and many of her online accounts were hacked. She resumed her studies in October 2014.

== Legacy ==
In 2010, Rollin stated that she did not really know if she regretted publishing her first video. She was mentioned in 2014 as an example of ridiculous rap and quick virtual notoriety despite lacking any musical talent. In February 2024, she gave an interview to the French infotainment outlet Melty discussing her life after going viral. She converted to Islam, which she had wanted to do since the age of 12, is married, has five children, and works in digital marketing.
