= BroadbandTV Corp =

Canadian media company

BBTV

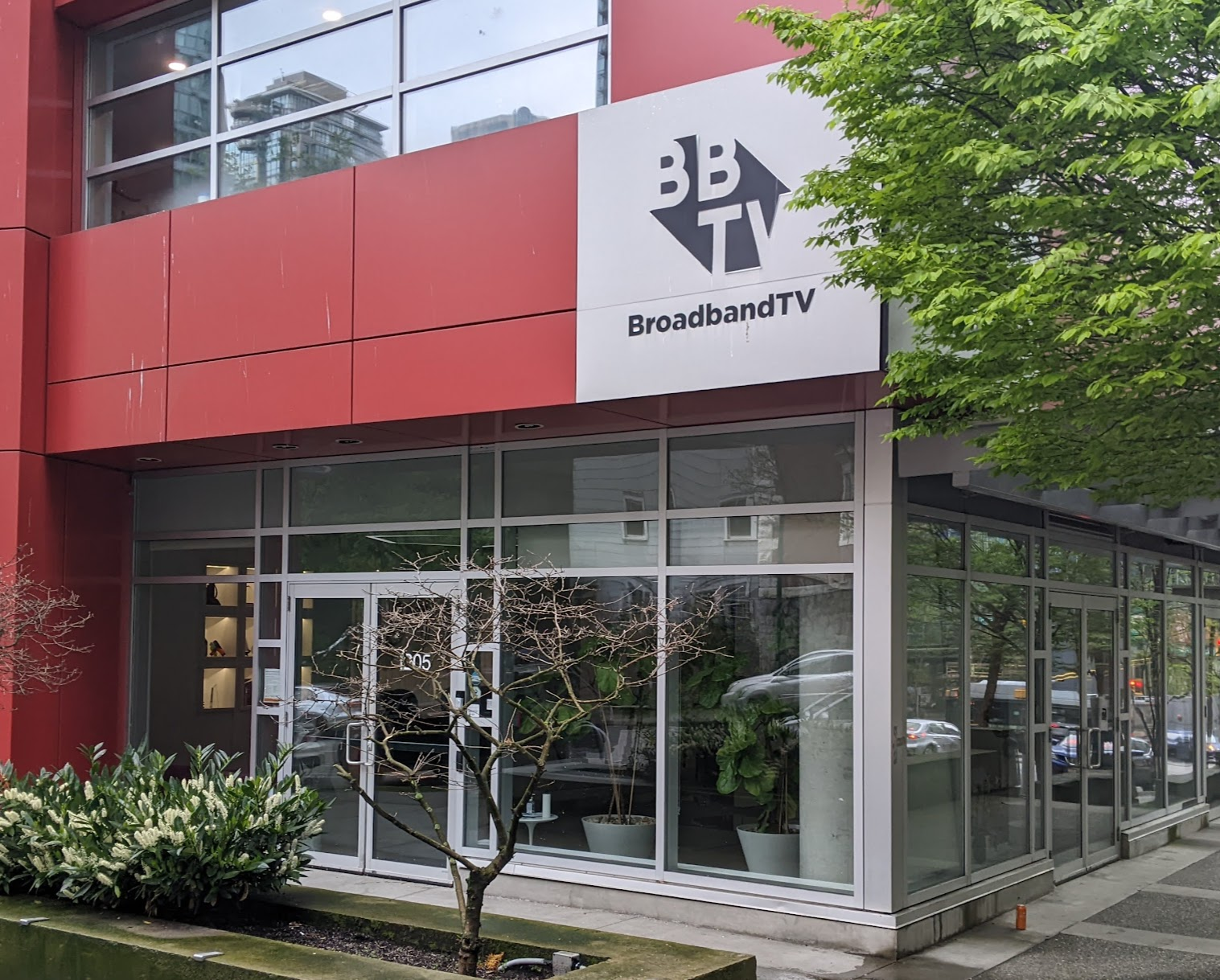
- Type: Private (2005-20, since 2024); Public (2020-24)
- Traded as: TSX: BBTV (2020-24)
- Industry: Internet Video
- Founded: 2005; 21 years ago
- Founder: Shahrzad Rafati
- Headquarters: Vancouver, British Columbia, Canada
- Key people: Shahrzad Rafati (CEO)
- Website: www.bbtv.com

BBTV is a Canadian media and technology company founded by CEO Shahrzad Rafati in 2005. In 2019, the company was the second-largest video property by unique viewers, according to comScore. Its head office is in Vancouver, British Columbia, Canada. BBTV's clients include the NBA, Paramount Global, and Sony Pictures.

BBTV completed an initial public offering of its subordinate voting stock on the Toronto Stock Exchange on October 28, 2020, valuing the Company's shares at C$16.00 per share. On January 10, 2024 the Company completed a "going-private" transaction whereby insiders of BBTV, including the Company's CEO Shahrzad Rafati, acquired the outstanding subordinate voting shares at a price of C$0.375 per share, representing a 98% decline in value from the Company's IPO.

== History ==
=== 2005-2009 ===
BBTV was founded as an OTT set-top box company in 2005, but the company soon turned to the digital video space. Rafati's idea was to create software which would change how companies approached piracy, resulting in technology which enabled companies to claim and monetize content uploaded by fans.

In 2009, the NBA became a client of BBTV's and success monetizing NBA footage in fan videos led to organizations like Sony Pictures quickly signing up. BBTV expanded to work with individual YouTube channels who also wanted to monetize their content.

=== 2010–2015 ===
European media group RTL bought 51% of BBTV in 2013 for $36M USD.

In fall 2014, BBTV opened offices in New York City, to host the company's branded entertainment division, which brokers deals between content creators and brands.

By December 2015 BBTV had become the number one MCN globally, outperforming Disney's Maker Studios. After that, the company began creating more content in-house.

=== 2016–present ===
In 2016, BBTV moved its Vancouver office to a bigger space.

It expanded on its working relationship with Sony Pictures in 2018 by co-releasing the official Breaking Bad YouTube channel.

In the same year, BBTV also launched its Interactive division, devoted to original games and mobile apps built around digital IP and audiences, as well as its Distribution and Label services for artists.

In 2019, BBTV announced that its content garnered 575 million unique viewers each month, making it second only to Google in terms of all monthly internet viewership, per a February 2019 comScore study.

== Investments, partnerships & acquisitions ==
In June 2013, BroadbandTV received a $36 million private placement from RTL Group. At the time, this marked the largest private placement into an internet media company in Canada since 2007.

In April 2014, TV production firm FremantleMedia partnered with BroadbandTV to identify and manage user-uploaded content on YouTube for more than 200 shows, including American Idol, The Price Is Right, America's Got Talent, Baywatch, and The X Factor. In September 2014, BBTV signed a multi-year original content agreement with FremantleMedia North America's digital studio, Tiny Riot "to produce original programming in the entertainment, gaming, and music genres."

In August 2014, BBTV renewed its existing YouTube rights-management deal with the National Basketball Association to manage fan-uploaded content on the site. The NBA channel is the largest professional sports channel on YouTube, boasting over 5.6 million subscribers and more than 2.2 billion page views at the time of the renewal. In 2016, BBTV and The NBA also launched NBA Playmakers, a new digital entertainment brand focused around basketball culture.

In April 2015, BroadbandTV acquired YoBoHo; a company based in Mumbai, which operates the HooplaKidz children's brand on YouTube. HooplaKidz is the largest preschool and K-12 educational digital-first producer on YouTube.

In summer 2015, BroadbandTV partnered with leading YouTube analytics website SocialBlade "to supply data and services to its community of users". SocialBlade previously offered partnership through Maker Studios' entry-level partnership program, Maker Gen.

In August 2020, Jukin Media announced partnerships with BroadbandTV and Fullscreen.

== Technology brands ==
Its technology brands include VISO Catalyst, VISO NOVI, and VISO Prism.

== Controversy ==
In 2023, BBTV was accused of withholding revenue from content creators on its networks, including YouTubers Ethan Klein, Pierce Alexander Kavanagh (Kavos), and Zack James (Yo Mama). Klein repeatedly threatened legal action. Following backlash, the Twitter accounts for both the company and CEO Shahrzad Rafati were made private. Klein and Kavanagh later confirmed that the owed revenue had eventually been paid.
