= Valleyarm =

Digital content distribution company

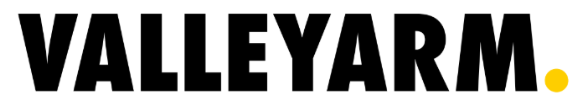
- Type: Public
- Industry: Digital Distribution
- Founded: April 27, 2010; 16 years ago in Melbourne, Victoria, Australia
- Headquarters: Darlinghurst, New South Wales, Australia
- Area served: Worldwide
- Website: vamedianetwork.com

Valleyarm is a digital content distribution company founded in 2010. Initially, the company focused on digital music delivery, working primarily with independent artists and record labels to distribute content globally. Artists and labels have included Gotye, Silverchair, Missy Higgins, Devo, Shock Records, and Eleven Music.

In 2012, Valleyarm extended its services to include YouTube channel management and optimization services for content owners and creators. Current clients include Turner Broadcasting, Beyond International, Southern Cross Austereo, and Moshcam.

Valleyarm is based in Darlinghurst, New South Wales (primary) and Docklands, Victoria, Australia.

== History ==
Valleyarm was founded in 2010 by a group of music industry executives as a digital music distribution platform. On July 8, 2010, Valleyarm acquired Brisbane-based competitor Musicadium.

In 2012, Valleyarm was presented with an iAward for New Media and Entertainment, recognizing the company's pioneering method of content delivery.

By 2012, Valleyarm had broadened their services to include YouTube channel management and had been invited by Google to become a multi-channel network (MCN) partner. By 2014, Google considered Valleyarm the largest MCN in the Asia-Pacific (APAC) region. Their network includes over 160 channels of content owners and creators that generate over 300 million views and 1.5 billion minutes watched per month.

In 2016, former BMG, Warner Music Australia, and ARIA executive Ed St. John joined the board of directors. In 2017, former Warner Music Australia and Murdoch Books executive Mark Ashbridge joined as Managing Director.

== Artists and labels ==
Below are a list of selected artists and labels currently with Valleyarm:

- Wheatley Records
- Half A Cow Records
- Devo
- Vanessa Amorosi
- The Fauves
- Dragon
