= Marc Ladreit de Lacharrière =

French businessman (born 1940)

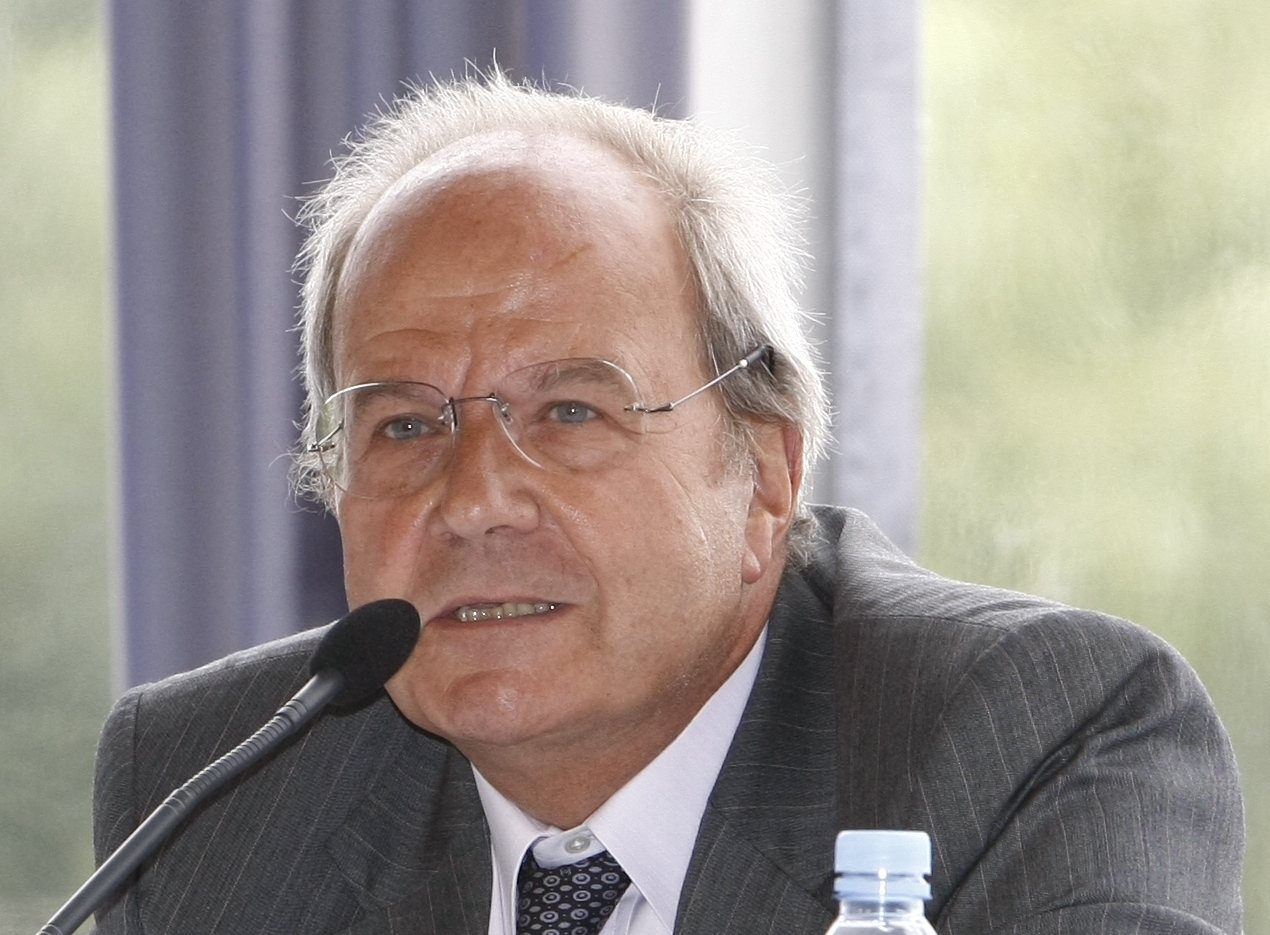
- Born: November 6, 1940 (age 85); Nice, France
- Education: École nationale d'administration
- Occupation: Businessman
- Spouse(s): Sibylle Lucet (div.); Véronique Morali
- Children: 4

Marc Eugène Charles Ladreit de Lacharrière (born November 6, 1940) is the CEO of FIMALAC (a.k.a. Financière Marc de Lacharrière), once majority owner of credit rating agency Fitch Group from which it divested between 2015 and 2018, selling its stake to Hearst Corporation.

On the Forbes 2016 list of the world's billionaires, he was ranked #722 with a net worth of US$2.4 billion.

== Early life ==
Marc Ladreit de Lacharrière was born on November 6, 1940, in Nice. From 1968 to 1970, he attended the École nationale d'administration.

== Career ==
In 1961, he started a teen magazine and sold it off a few years later. He then worked for Suez, Masson, and Valeurs Actuelles. He worked for L'Oréal for fifteen years, and was its CEO for a while. He was the Chairman of Duff & Phelps. He is a member of the Board of Directors of Renault, L'Oréal, Gilbert Coullier Productions, Cassina, and Canal Plus. He is Honorary Chairman of the Comité national des conseillers du commerce extérieur de la France (French National Committee of Foreign Trade Advisors), and a member of the Consultative Committee of Banque de France. He is a former member of the Steering Committee of the Bilderberg Group.

In 2018, he was found guilty of misappropriating funds as part of the Fillon affair, an employment scandal involving Penelope Fillon, the wife of then French politician François Fillon. He was sentenced to eight months in prison.

In 2015, the Groupe Marc de Lacharriere (GML), his family holding company, invested in a 5% stake in Warburg Pincus. Apart from a single Middle Eastern sovereign wealth fund, GML is the only known third-party owner of a general partnership stake in Warburg Pincus. In 2024, Charles Kaye, CEO of Warburg Pincus, commented that GML was a "constructive shareholder”, treated like partners in the firm, and had “given us capital to invest in our own funds and fund new initiatives.”

== Philanthropy ==
He sits on the Board of the American Friends of the Louvre. He helped renovate the Théâtre du Rond-Point in Paris. He is a former vice-chairman of Fondation Agir Contre l'Exclusion (FACE), which he co-founded with Martine Aubry. He is also a member of the Fondation Culture et Diversité, Conseil artistique des musées nationaux, Fondation Bettencourt Schueller, Fondation nationale des sciences politiques, Musée des arts décoratifs, the Société des Amis du Musée du quai Branly. In 2006, he was elected to the Académie des Beaux-Arts. In August 2010, he was named Goodwill Ambassador for the UNESCO. He is the President of the Revue des deux Mondes.

== Personal life ==
He is divorced, with four children and has one sister, Jacqueline Hacker de Lacharriere, married to Swiss industrial tycoon Manfred Hacker. She is the first woman playing polo on snow and has founded the La Martina brand.

== Filmography ==
- 2016 : Carole Matthieu (producer)
- 2017 : Patients (co-producer)

== See also ==
- List of French people by net worth
