= Uturn Entertainment =

Multi-Channel Network/Media Company based in Saudi Arabia

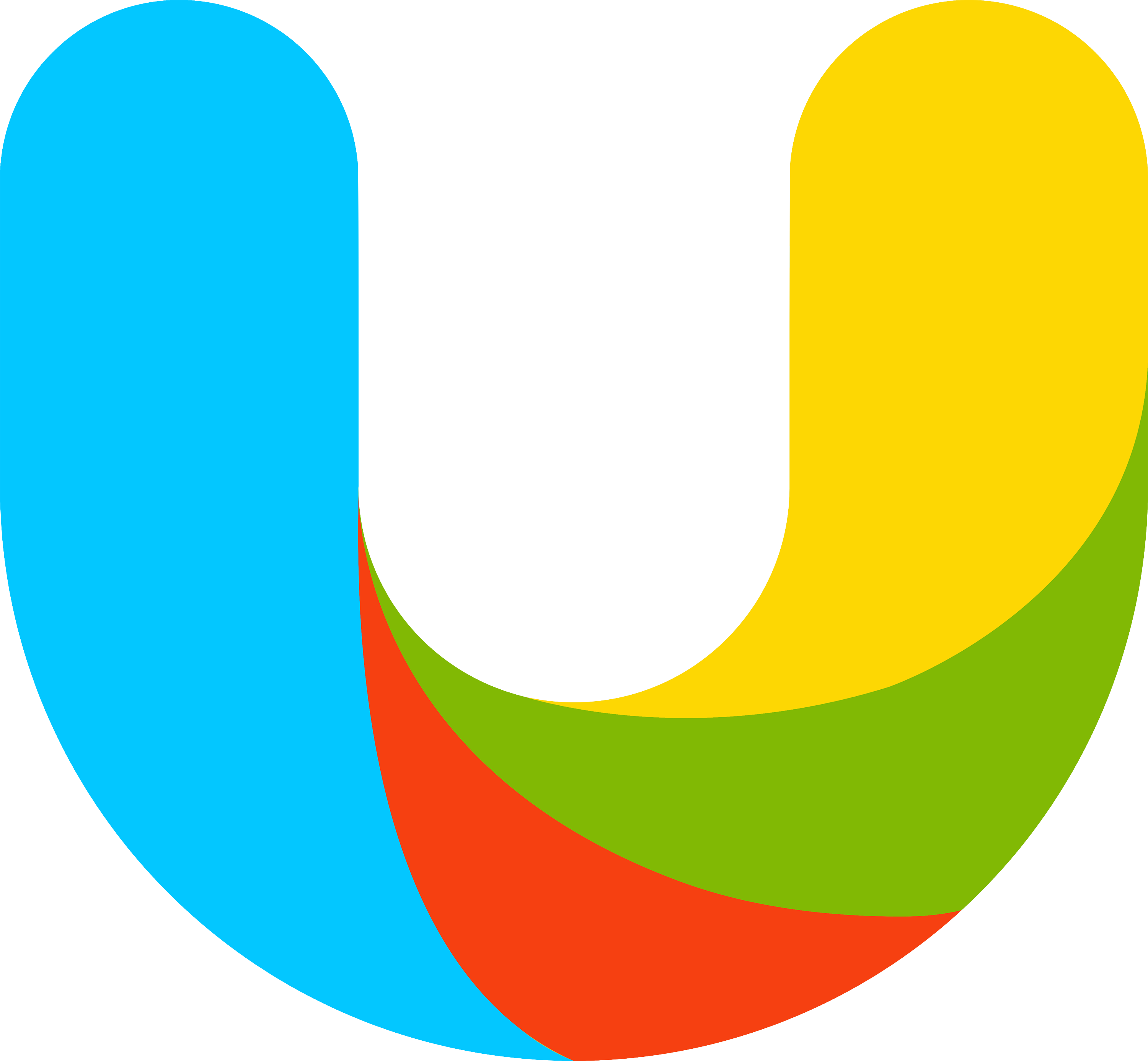
upright!UTURN Entertainment Network logo

UTURN Entertainment is an online entertainment network providing Arabic video content.

UTURN was established in Jeddah, Saudi Arabia, as a digital production company in 2010. It started by producing original YouTube shows (Eysh Elly, 3al6ayer, Noon Alniswa, Ana W Heya, Aldor Al3asher). After the first batch of shows, UTURN started to create and aggregate online video content, targeting Arab audiences worldwide, especially from Saudi Arabia, UAE, Kuwait, and Bahrain. The Financial Times named UTURN the largest MCN (multi-channel network) in the region.

Kaswara Alkhatib the CEO of UTURN was ranked #1 in the Forbes Middle East list of Entrepreneurs Shaping Saudi Arabia's Future in 2015.

== Awards ==
Name	Award	Year
The Arab States Broadcasting Union (ASBU) BroadcastPro	Multi Channel Of The Year	2015
Arabian Business Achievement Award	Small Business of the Year	2014
