= Overblog =

OverBlog
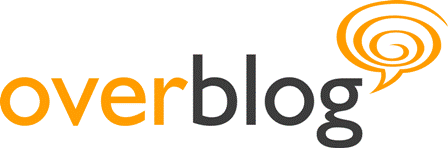
- Website type: Blog hosting
- Owner: Ebuzzing
- Website: overblog.com
- Commercial: Yes
- Launched: August, 2004
- Current status: Active

OverBlog is a blogging service from company Ebuzzing (from the merger of OverBlog and Ebuzzing). The company was founded in 2004 by Frédéric Montagnon, Gilles Moncaubeig and Julien Romanetto in Toulouse, France.

In 2010, OverBlog merged with Ebuzzing, Wikio and Nomao.

Originally launched in October 2004, OverBlog reached 62 million uniques in February 2014 according to Quantcast.

OverBlog launched in the US during Blog World 2012. The service is available in English, Spanish, French, Italian and German.

Fimalac's Webedia acquired Overblog from Ebuzzing & Teads early in 2014.
