= Multi-channel network =

Type of online media organization

A multi-channel network (MCN) is an organization that works with video platforms to offer assistance to channel owners in areas such as "product, programming, funding, cross-promotion, partner management, digital rights management, monetization and sales, and audience development," in exchange for a percentage of the ad revenue from the channel.

== Name origin ==
The term "multi-channel network" (MCN) was coined by former YouTube employee and Next New Networks co-founder Jed Simmons. It has since become standard vocabulary in the YouTube ecosystem.

At the time of YouTube's acquisition of Next New Networks (2011), the word "Network" had a confusing meaning inside of YouTube considering its engineering culture. Prior to 2011 many names were used to describe YouTube channel companies, including Online Video Studio (OVS), Internet Television Company (ITC), YouTube Network or simply Network. Due to confusion both in the market and internally, YouTube senior executive Dean Gilbert wanted to clarify what a YouTube "Network" meant. Simmons, whose background was from cable TV and Turner Broadcasting (home of CNN, TNT, TBS, Cartoon Network et al.) hoped to distinguish companies who actively owned, managed and programmed original channels on YouTube from those that aggregated channels and creators but did not focus on channel programming and content. The Multi Channel Network name was chosen for those who actively managed AND programmed channels to emulate cable TV programming companies such as Turner, Discovery, Disney, Comcast and MTV Networks that owned and operated multiple channels ("multi-channel"). The MCN name was born within YouTube and its ecosystem.

Sub-networks of MCNs are known as SubMCNs, Virtual Networks, Proprietary Networks, Content Distribution Networks, SMCNs, VNs, PNs, or CDNs.

== Purpose ==
An MCN works by a company setting up an account with YouTube CMS (the system used for Content ID), the company adds anyone who signs a contract with them to their CMS, allowing users (and the CMS account owner) to use monetization, block and track policies. Monetization allows for videos to generate revenue, Block prevents access to videos and Track allows content owners to see the analytics of re-uploads and copyright infringing content. Some MCN partners can block videos by country (e.g., if a video is uploaded with a banned or unlicensed logo).

MCNs have been described as a means to "negate the hassle involved when seeking out your own advertising opportunities on the site." Advertisers who work with MCNs can pay for services including overlay adverts, product placement and in show sponsorships, aiming to gain repeated exposure, endorsement by YouTube personalities, and increased audience engagement, especially compared with television advertisements which are often ignored or skipped.

== Benefits ==
The benefits and drawbacks of partnering with a multi-channel network have been discussed by several high-profile YouTube creators, including Hank Green, Freddie Wong as well as YouTube itself.

The possible benefits can include:

- Access to video creation and publishing tools
- Marketing and promotion
- Access to production and editing facilities
- Higher CPM
- Access to traditional media projects and celebrities
- Cover song and background music licenses on copyrighted music
- Live events and merchandise

== Controversies ==
There have been several controversies involving YouTube Networks.

Machinima has been criticized for the use of perpetual contracts. Ben Vacas, known to the YouTube community as "Braindeadly", attracted media attention in January 2013 over contractual issues with Machinima. Under the terms of his contract, Machinima were permitted to place advertisements on Vacas's videos and in return he would receive a percentage of the profits generated. However, the contract also disclosed that it existed "in perpetuity"; meaning Machinima would hold the rights to any content created by Vacas published on his partnered YouTube channel in his lifetime, a detail Vacas failed to read.

Machinima was criticized in early 2013 by YouTuber Athene for "intimidating... multiple partners" to sign a contract that would significantly lower their CPM. Athene called it "one of the worst deals on the internet" and advised his subscribers not to "sign with Machinima" stating that they could get a better arrangement with other networks.

== Purchases ==
Several MCNs have been purchased by larger corporations. In early 2014 Maker Studios was sold to Disney for $500 million, and Big Frame was sold to DreamWorks Animation through AwesomenessTV for $15 million. In June 2013, RTL Group invested $36 million in BroadbandTV Corp.

== See also ==
- List of multi-channel networks
- Cost per impression
