= Necrid =

Fictional character

- Soulcalibur character
- Necrid from Soulcalibur II
- First game: Soulcalibur II (2002)
- Designed by: Todd McFarlane

In-universe information
- Weapon: Maleficus (Enigma)

Necrid (Japanese: ネクリッド, Hepburn: Nekuriddo) is a character in the Soulcalibur series of weapon-based fighting games. Designed by comic book artist and toy designer Todd McFarlane through a collaboration with Namco, the character appeared in console ports of Soulcalibur II and later as part of an action figure set created by McFarlane Productions. Necrid's concept and physical build were outlined by Namco, who aimed to target North American audiences with the character, while McFarlane provided the character's design and name.

Once a human warrior who sought the cursed sword Soul Edge, he was instead pulled into the dimension that the sword's spirit inhabits. Though he escaped, his mind and body were drastically mutated, and he lost his memories and sanity. He now wields various forms of energy as weapons while searching for fragments of the shattered Soul Edge to ease his pain. Necrid's spoken lines in the game are unintelligible, and no voice actor has been credited.

The character has received a divisive response. While some sources criticized the character's design for clashing with the game's aesthetic, some others praised the visual appeal of the character when in motion. Some have called Necrid one of the best characters introduced to the series, while others considered him one of the worst. McFarlane's involvement with the character's creation was also a particular point of criticism, with some feeling it had fallen short of its potential. Necrid has also been the subject of scholarly study, which examined the nature of monstrous designs in video gaming and how players react to such.

== Conception and development ==
Series producer Hiroaki Yotoriyama learned that comics creator Todd McFarlane was a fan of the Soulcalibur series and that McFarlane had praised their characters' designs. In 2003, McFarlane was interested in creating a new video game based on the Spawn comic book franchise; his search for a developer resulted in a deal with Soulcalibur publisher Namco. When the topic of toys arose in discussions, McFarlane and Namco reached an agreement to release a line of action figures based on Soulcalibur II characters. Afterward, Namco proposed that their company design a new character for video game console ports of the game, an idea that McFarlane accepted because he considered it an opportunity to create a toy based on Necrid's finished design.

Necrid's design targeted North American audiences, specifically fans of American comic books. Although McFarlane received most of the credit for the character, Necrid was the result of a collaboration; Namco outlined the then-unnamed character's traits, such as his in-game role and physical build, and McFarlane's company completed the design. As a result, both companies hold a partial copyright for Necrid, with Namco's rights to the character as a derivative work of McFarlane's illustrations.

=== Design ===
Standing 196 centimetres (6 ft 5 in) tall, Necrid is a bald, green, and muscular humanoid. His eyes glow bright red, and short bones protrude from his left arm, back, jaw and a Mohawk-like ridge on his head. The fingers on his right hand have claw points, but his left hand is much larger and has three fingers with large, talon-like bone claws. Two large, ram-like horns extend from opposite sides of his left wrist, toward and slightly beyond his elbow. His clothing consists of dark blue pants, large metal sandals held together by bandages, and armor plating covering his abdomen, the sides of his legs, and the back of his lower right arm. A pulsating red jewel described by McFarlane as a "power plant" is set in a circular piece of metal strapped to his chest.

Necrid's alternate appearance differs heavily, and features scaly, reddish–orange skin. Additional differences include teal eyes, black pants, and a blue jewel. The protruding bones are isolated and bigger on his left shoulder and arm, and appear crystalline. A pauldron covering his right shoulder is fastened to the jewel's support harness, and the armor on his legs incorporate a pair of greaves. He wears a fauld on his abdomen, and bandages wrap around his stomach. A mask covers his face and is held in place by two straps around his head. Necrid's speech is unintelligible, and the vocal samples in the game's sound test feature are named after emotions, such as "Determination" and "Indignation". He is the only speaking Soulcalibur II character whose voice does not change when the player selects a different language setting.

== Appearances ==
As introduced in Soulcalibur II, Necrid is a warrior who fought and defeated a former wielder of the cursed sword Soul Edge in 400 B.C., and was pulled into the dimension where the sword's spirit, Inferno, inhabited. Instead of battling Inferno, he fled, and became trapped in the dimension for centuries. Warped physically and mentally by the dimension as a result, he escaped during the closing events of Soulcalibur. However he quickly found that without the dimension's energies he experienced intense pain and would eventually die. Attacking travelers he perceived as enemies, he happened upon a fragment of Soul Edge and felt his pain dampened. Pursuing other fragments of the sword, he encountered Talim, who was also seeking them, and helped defeat the resurrected Inferno. His memories and sanity restored by the battle, Necrid closed the entrance to the void, trapping himself within.

To date, Necrid has appeared in only one game of the series, Soulcalibur II. He did not appear in the original arcade version, but was added later when the game was ported to the GameCube, PlayStation 2, and Xbox video game consoles. When asked whether the character would return in Soulcalibur III, Yotoriyama replied, "Necrid has gone on vacation." When the subject came up again during the production of Soulcalibur V, game director Daishi Odashima responded via his Twitter account, “To be honest, that will be too hard to do due to copyright issues.” Despite this, his backstory was later elaborated on in the book SoulCalibur: New Legends of Project Soul.

=== Gameplay ===
Using fighting skills Yotoriyama described as "horrific splendor", Necrid attacks using Maleficus, a transforming, physical manifestation of the energy in Soul Edge. He controls Maleficus by channeling it through his hands to form various bladed weapons, able to set them aside or reabsorb them as needed. Necrid can also attack using other forms of energy, such as ignis fatuus, æther, and chaos, represented in game as equipable alternate weapons with varying effects and attributes. Necrid also incorporates acrobatics into his fighting style through a variety of flips and kicks.

Several of Necrid's attacks duplicate physical motions and properties of attacks used by other characters in the series. However, each attack causes his weapon to extend from then retract into his hands, resulting in different visual cues than the move they derive from. Some attacks combine elements of two other existing character moves; for example, Dragon Blaze begins with one attack used by Maxi and ends with another from Nightmare. Despite this fact some moves are unique to Necrid's repertoire, such as "Elder Topaz", an attack stance that allows the use of an altered set of attacks for a short time, and "Void Cannon", which creates a small explosion on the ground at varying distances from Necrid.

== Promotion and reception ==
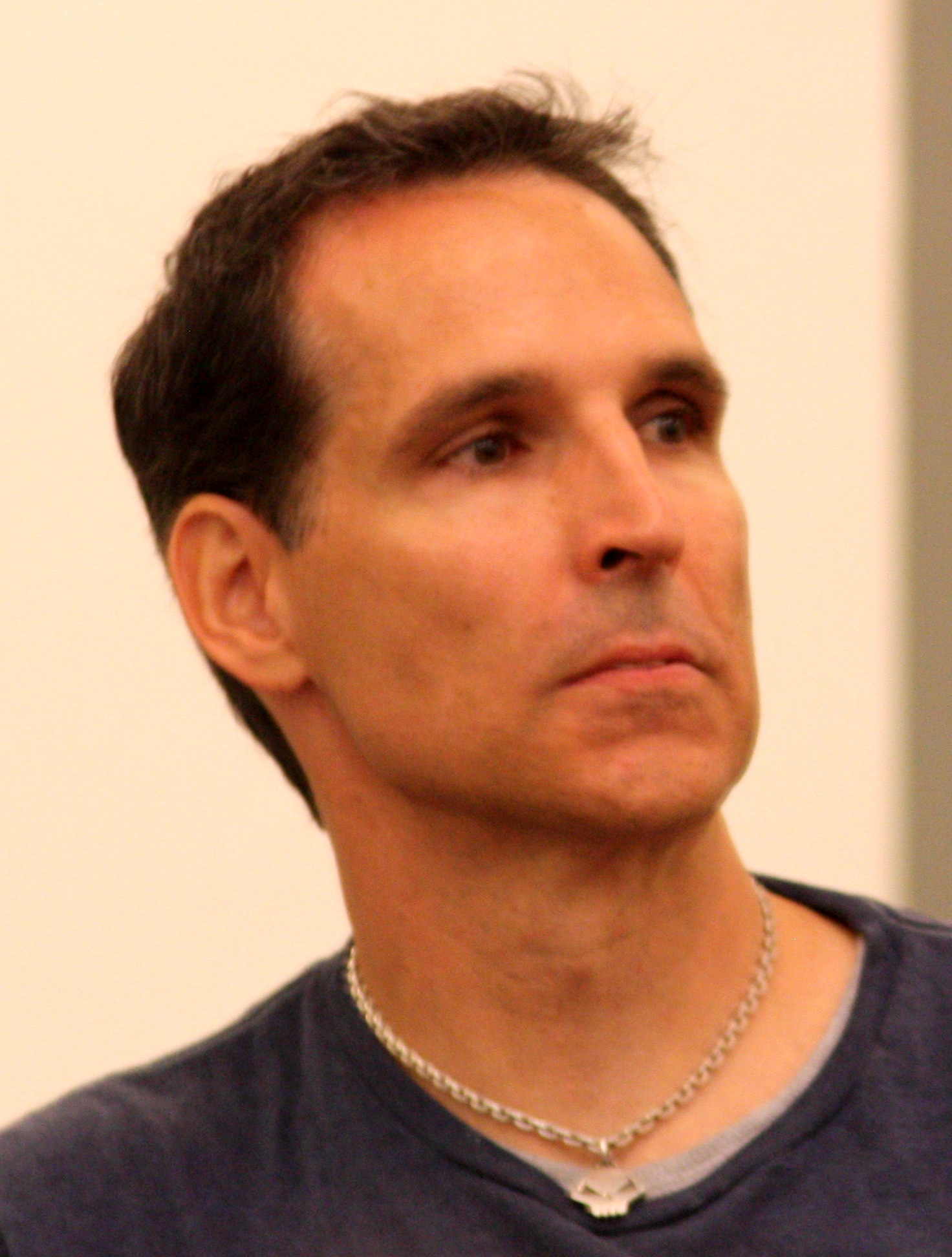
Much criticism about Necrid revolved around McFarlane's involvement in his creation

Yotoriyama announced Necrid early in Soulcalibur II's production for the Xbox, in an interview with the Japanese magazine Famitsu. McFarlane Productions distributed one thousand copies of a limited-edition lithograph to promote the character at E3 2003. Drawn by Greg Capullo, the lithograph featured a comic-book rendition of Necrid, fighting Spawn in one of the game's arenas. In August 2003, Namco included a sculpture of Necrid in a set of five based on different Soulcalibur II characters. The figure was based on Necrid's secondary outfit, stood 6 inches (15 cm) tall (with a base), and allowed for adjustment of its head and arms. McFarlane Productions later gave the sculptures and copies of the game as prizes in a contest named after the character.

Critical response to Necrid varied. A staff writer for GameNOW magazine called the visual design "silly" and compared the character to an "old-school He-Man character", but added that Necrid's gameplay was decent. Another magazine, GMR, described him "the game's crudfest character" and "a prime example of why Japanese developers should steer far away from Western 'designers' [...] his design is taken straight from the pages of Bad American Comic Book Design 101". IGN's Kaiser Hwang called Necrid a "disappointment" and questioned the character's design in comparison to others in the series; he also felt Necrid was "filler" rather than a complete character. GameSpot made similar comments in their review of the game, as did GameSpy. IGN's Xbox article editor described the character's inclusion as an unnecessary marketing ploy and would have preferred new characters made without McFarlane's involvement; the editor also wrote that Necrid did not "vibe" with the rest of the game. 1UP.com's podcast Retronauts criticized the design and stated that the character's name was used as a synonym for "shitty". They further added that McFarlane had "tainted" the game with Necrid's inclusion, with host Jeremy Parish stating "I could close my eyes and draw a better character".

In a retrospective of the series, Joystiq used him as an example of the series succumbing to "commercial gimmicks", citing his design as reviled and that Necrid was either too strong or too weak a character to play as, depending on who one asked. Eurogamer, when reviewing the 2013 HD remaster of Soulcalibur II, stated that in terms of in-game balance Necrid was the only character "in need of a tune-up", further adding "unless you really want to play as this emaciated Hulk with a chest-plate, it's easy just to forget that he's there". In 2020, Paul Disalvo of Game Rant described Necrid as one of the worst character designs in fighting games, stating that while McFarlane's involvement had potential, the results were "far from stellar" and "To say that Necrid is out of place in Soul Calibur's roster of samurai and knights would be an enormous understatement."

Other outlets instead praised the character's gameplay and design. An editor for the video game website GameZone wrote that his attacks compensated for his appearance and described him as "cool", while also praising both his weapon and fighting style. Adam Sessler and Morgan Webb of X-Play stated that, while Necrid did not seem to fit the aesthetic, the character did have some appeal. UGO's Doug Trueman stated Necrid's weapon had to be "seen to be believed", and described him among other new characters as "[adding] something spectacular to the Soul Calibur pantheon". Tim Rogers of website Insert Credit called Necrid "a work of digital art both in form and function" and added that "as far as console-only characters go—everybody wins with Necrid". Despite their negative remarks, Jesse Schedeen of IGN wrote that while they felt the character's gameplay was unbalanced, it added to Necrid's appeal, stating "what do you expect from a man who shares a symbiotic relationship with the very energy that powers Soul Edge? If you needed to clean house in [Soulcalibur II], Necrid was the man for the job."

University of Delaware professor Rachel Hutchinson cited him as an example of the cultural stereotype of human versus monster, a "mutated or damned [creature] deviant from the human norm" that the game's human characters are expected to vanquish. In a later study involving students, male students stated an assumption that female players would not be interested in playing an "ugly character" like Necrid over other strong female characters in the game like Taki, a belief she noted her data did not support as she found an unwillingness to play as the character regardless of gender. Another student suggested they believed it due to being unable to "relate" to monster characters in such games, however Hutchinson retorted characters like Voldo were popular choices by comparison, and other students had reacted more favorably to other non-human characters in the Soulcalibur series.
