= Music of the Soulcalibur series =

Soulcalibur is a weapon-based fighting game series by Namco Bandai Games. The series revolves around a sword that, after years of bloodshed and hatred, gained a soul of its own, the Soul Edge, and the sword forged to counter it, Soulcalibur. The discography of the Soulcalibur series consists of two soundtrack albums for the first game in the series, Soul Edge, and one soundtrack album each for Soulcalibur, Soulcalibur II, III, IV, V and VI. None of the other games in the series have received a soundtrack release.

Music from the series was performed by a live orchestra at a concert at the Salle Pleyel in Paris in February 2017.

== Super Battle Sound Attack Soul Edge ==
Super Battle Sound Attack Soul Edge

Soundtrack album by Various artists
- Released: September 20, 1996; October 21, 1996
- Genre: Video game soundtrack
- Length: 42:24
- Label: Media Remoras; Pony Canyon (reprint)

Super Battle Sound Attack Soul Edge is the soundtrack album for the arcade version of Soul Edge. It was composed by Namco employees Takayuki Aihara and Takanori Otsuka, with Aihara providing the majority of the tracks while Otsuka composed tracks 9, 11, 16, 20, and 25. Its 26 tracks have a duration of 42:24. The album was published by Media Remoras on September 20, 1996, with the catalog number of MRCA-20099, and reprinted by Pony Canyon a month later on October 21, 1996, with the catalog number PCCG-00365.

Track list
No.	Title	Length
1.	"The Wind and Cloud"	2:44
2.	"Opening Title Ver. 1"	0:16
3.	"Epic Calling!"	0:15
4.	"Into the Battle"	0:08
5.	"Future Dancin'"	1:37
6.	"And the Blind Shall See"	0:47
7.	"Heavenly Engage"	3:13
8.	"Soul and Sword"	2:47
9.	"Goddess in Triumph"	0:50
10.	"Dragon's Call"	2:52
11.	""The Deed is Done""	0:50
12.	"The Gears of Madness"	2:47
13.	"Kkaduri"	2:08
14.	"War Age"	0:50
15.	"Horangi Arirang"	2:47
16.	"Sparrow's Return"	0:50
17.	"Recollect Continent"	3:04
18.	"Bravely Folk Song"	3:08
19.	"Sunrise Promise"	0:50
20.	"Opening Title Ver. 2"	0:27
21.	"The Carnage Has Begun ~ Into a Trance"	0:49
22.	"Coming Soon"	0:25
23.	"Courage"	1:41
24.	"World Atlas Collapsed"	2:39
25.	"The Last Bit of Hope ~ Dragon's Gasp"	0:50
26.	"Finale and End Credit"	1:50

== Soul Edge Original Soundtrack - Khan Super Session ==
Soul Edge Original Soundtrack - Khan Super Session

Soundtrack album by Various artists
- Released: December 18, 1996
- Genre: Video game soundtrack
- Length: 58:09
- Label: BMG Japan

Soul Edge Original Soundtrack - Khan Super Session is the soundtrack album for the PlayStation version of Soul Edge, which contained entirely different music than the arcade version, including "The Edge of Soul", which served as this version's main theme. It was composed by Masumi Itō (tracks 1, 3, 5, 7, 11, and 14), Benten Maru (2, 8, 10, and 16), Yoshiyuki Ito (6 and 12), Aki Hata (4), and Taku Iwasaki (9, 13 and 15). Its 16 tracks have a duration of 58:09. The album was published by BMG Japan on December 18, 1996, with the catalog number BVCH-732.

Track list
No.	Title	Length
1.	"Doubtful Judgement" (Soul Edge Stage)	3:46
2.	"The Edge of Soul" (PlayStation Intro Movie BGM)	4:20
3.	"An Oath of the Sword" (Character Select)	1:33
4.	"P.N.K.N." (Coloseum – Asia Stages)	3:46
5.	"Castaway into Darkness" (Cervantes)	3:42
6.	"Hagakure" (Mitsurugi)	3:58
7.	"Eternal Memories" (Name Entry)	1:31
8.	"A Haunting Wind" (Taki)	3:58
9.	"Another Fanatic" (Voldo)	3:43
10.	"Moonlight Shadows" (Li Long)	4:25
11.	"A Continental Gale" (Rock)	3:46
12.	"Tiny Amulet" (Seung Mina)	3:44
13.	"Yellow Sands" (Hwang Sung)	3:31
14.	"A Mediterranean Call" (Sophitia)	3:45
15.	"Darkness of Fate" (Siegfreid)	4:07
16.	"Our Way Home" (Credits BGM)	4:34

== Soulcalibur Original Soundtrack ==
Soulcalibur Original Soundtrack

Soundtrack album by Various artists
- Released: October 21, 1999
- Genre: Video game soundtrack
- Length: 1:02:26 (Disc 1); 10:55 (Disc 2)
- Label: Bandai Music Entertainment

Soulcalibur Original Soundtrack is the soundtrack album for the second game in the Soul series, Soulcalibur. It was composed by Namco employees Junichi Nakatsuru, Yoshihito Yano, Akitaka Tohyama, Takanori Otsuka, and Hideki Tobeta. Its 37 tracks span two discs and have a duration of 1:13:21. The second disc is only four tracks long, and contains two arrangements of tracks from the first disc made for the arcade version of the game as well as two additional arrangements. The album was published by Bandai Music Entertainment on October 21, 1999, with the catalog number APCG-9006.

Track list

Disc 1
No.	Title	Japanese title	Length
1.	"Light & Darkness"	光と闇の闘い(オープニング)	2:01
2.	"The Stage of History"	歴史の舞台へ(キャラクターセレクト)	1:07
3.	"The New Legend"	新たなる伝説 剣聖の石庭(キリク＆エッジマスター)	2:37
4.	"Bloom and Harvest"	花の盛りと実りの時 神宗帝の庭園(シャンファ)	2:33
5.	"Sail Over the Storm"	荒海を越えて インドの港街(マキシ)	2:46
6.	"Duelists"	刃に生き，刃に死す 備中高松城(御剣)	2:48
7.	"The Cursed Soul"	呪われし心臓 方広寺～地下大仏殿(タキ)	2:52
8.	"Remembrance"	懐かしい幻 秘倉マネーピッ(ヴォルド)ト	2:38
9.	"Wings of Faith"	信念の翼 エイリュディケ神殿～神々の回廊(ソフィーティア)	2:37
10.	"In Father's Name"	父の名の元に オストラインスブルク攻城戦跡(ナイトメア)	2:27
11.	"Bred From the Gap"	狭間より沸き出でし者 バルギア大神殿(アスタロス)～クンペクトー&	2:40
12.	"Unblessed Soul"	祝福されざる者 ヴァレンタイン邸(アイヴィー)	2:34
13.	"Beyond the Horizon"	地平線の果てに シルクロードの遺跡(黄星京)	2:32
14.	"Chasing Downstream"	激流の彼方 霊峰富士～地下水脈(吉光)	2:44
15.	"Worth Dying For"	死に値するもの ヴェネツィアの水路(ジークフリート)	2:29
16.	"Gathering: Destiny Beckons"	戦士たちの集い：宿命の引力 古代闘技場跡	2:51
17.	"Eye to Eye, Blade to Blade"	火花散る魂の激闘 トルコの地下迷宮～死者の間(成美那)	1:31
18.	"Leaving the World Behind"	全てを捨てて エイドリアン号と海岸砦(セルバンデス)	2:51
19.	"Immortal Flame"	不死の焔 カオス～心象世界(インフェルノ)	2:44
20.	"Everlasting Quest"	旅果つる先は…(ミッションバトル：マップ画面)	1:33
21.	"Going to Where the Wind Blows"	風に吹かれるまま(スライドショー)	1:50
22.	"Kaleidoscope"	揺れ動く未来～戦士たちの偶像(オープニングディレクション)	1:22
23.	"Going to Where the Wind Blows: Reprise"	風に吹かれるがまま：回想(アートギャラリー)	2:29
24.	"The Seal Was Broken"	解かれし封印(カードゲットジングル)	0:09
25.	"Prepare to Unleash Yourself"	白刃の煌めき(乱入ジングル１)	0:08
26.	"Prepare to Defend Yourself"	黒金の咆哮(乱入ジングル２)	0:07
27.	"Apocalypse"	黙示の時代(エンディング１)	0:44
28.	"Sacrifice"	消えゆく魂(エンディング２)	0:43
29.	"Forever Onward"	終わりなき旅(エンディング３)	0:42
30.	"Into the Sunlight"	今，光の中へ(エンディング４)	0:44
31.	"No Remorse, No Pain"	鋼の意志(エンディング５)	0:42
32.	"The Legend Will Never Die"	伝説は死なず(ネームエントリー)	1:41
33.	"Recollection: A Tribute to Those Who Shed Red"	魂の記憶：赤き血を流せし者達へ(エンドクレジット)	2:10

Disc 2
No.	Title	Japanese title	Length
1.	"Under the Star of Destiny" (arcade version)	宿命の星のもと(AC版アトラクト)	0:49
2.	"Recollection: A Tribute to Those Who Shed Red" (arcade version)	AC版エンドクレジット	1:57
3.	"Light & Darkness" (soul mix)	光と闇の闘い	4:55
4.	"Going to Where the Wind Blows" (piano mix)	風に吹かれるがまま	3:14

== Soulcalibur II Original Soundtrack ==
Soulcalibur II Original Soundtrack

Soundtrack album by Various artists
- Released: March 26, 2003
- Genre: Video game soundtrack
- Length: 1:09:16 (Disc 1); 39:57 (Disc 2)
- Label: DigiCube

Soulcalibur II Original Soundtrack is the soundtrack album for the third game in the Soul series, Soulcalibur II. It was composed by Namco employees Junichi Nakatsuru, Yoshihito Yano, Asuka Sakai, Rio Hamamoto, Ryuichi Takada, and Junichi Takagi. Nakatsuru and Yano had also worked on the prequel's soundtrack. The album's 35 tracks span two discs and have a duration of 1:49:13. The album was published by DigiCube on March 26, 2003, with the catalog numbers SSCX-10086~7. 28 of the tracks were included in a CD distributed with the game's strategy guide in North America titled Soulcalibur II Limited Edition Strategy Guide Soundtrack on August 21, 2003. The GameCube version of the game received an exclusive track that was a remix of The Legend of Zelda theme which played in Link's profile and Destined Battle.

Track list

Disc 1
No.	Title	Japanese title	Length
1.	"Under The Star Of Destiny"	運命の星の下に	2:08
2.	"History Unfolds"	新たな歴史の舞台へようこそ	1:11
3.	"Unwavering Resolve"	その決意に一辺の曇りなし	4:18
4.	"Guided By Wind"	己を導く風のささやき	3:58
5.	"Evil Reborn"	蘇えりし悪	3:38
6.	"Raise Thy Sword"	己が剣を高く掲げよ	3:31
7.	"Brave Sword, Braver Soul"	鋼の信念	3:42
8.	"Chasing Death"	死に急ぐが如く	3:39
9.	"Destiny Awaits No One"	運命に追い越されないように	3:45
10.	"No Turning Back"	一線を越える決断	3:26
11.	"Eternal Struggle"	終わり無き戦い	3:35
12.	"Hubris"	おごれる者は久しからず	4:08
13.	"Confrontation"	対決	3:56
14.	"Sword Of The Patriot"	愛国の剣	4:12
15.	"Ordinary Pain"	安息無き刃	3:40
16.	"If There Were Any Other Way"	非情なる宿命の絆	3:27
17.	"Nothing To Lose"	すべてを賭けて	3:30
18.	"Hellfire"	地獄の炎	4:00
19.	"The Battle Ends"	戦いの終わり	0:38
20.	"Slave Of Desire"	欲望の虜	0:37
21.	"Burning Soul"	烈火の如く燃える魂	0:35
22.	"The Journey Continues"	永遠に続く旅路	0:36
23.	"Path Of Destiny" (arcade version)	自ら切り開く運命	3:06

Disc 2
No.	Title	Japanese title	Length
1.	"Tales Of Souls And Swords"	剣と魂の物語	1:48
2.	"Quest For Glory"	栄光への道	3:20
3.	"Windshadow"	闇を落とす嵐を追って	2:44
4.	"Maze Of The Blade"	剣王の墓	6:49
5.	"Labyrinth Of Moonlight"	月光の迷宮	5:38
6.	"Whispers Of The Sword"	共鳴する剣と魂	1:05
7.	"Path Of Destiny"	自ら切り開く運命	5:27
8.	"Into The Whirlwind"	戦いの嵐の中へ	2:53
9.	"Healing Winds"	戦士を癒す風	2:38
10.	"The Noble Blade"	誇り高き魂の剣	0:57
11.	"Healing Winds:Reprise"	戦士を癒す風	3:17
12.	"Hubris:Reprise"	おごれる者は久しからず	3:21

== Soulcalibur III Original Soundtrack ==
Soulcalibur III Original Soundtrack - Legend of Sounds

Soundtrack album by Various artists
- Released: November 23, 2005
- Genre: Video game soundtrack
- Length: 1:09:50 (Disc 1); 1:06:03 (Disc 2)
- Producer: Victor Entertainment

Soulcalibur III Original Soundtrack - Legend of Sounds is the soundtrack album for Soulcalibur III. It was composed by Namco employees Junichi Nakatsuru, Ryuichi Takada, and Keiki Kobayashi. Its 62 tracks span two discs and have a duration of 2:15:53. The album was published by Victor Entertainment on November 23, 2005, with the catalog number VIZL-158. Like the previous soundtrack in the series, a one-disc, 35-track version of the album was included in the North American strategy guide for the game. It was released on October 25, 2005.

Track list

Disc 1
No.	Title	Japanese title	Length
1.	"Hour of Destiny"	運命の満つる時へ	3:50
2.	"Lorekeeper"	伝承は語る	1:24
3.	"History Beckons"	歴史の舞台へのいざない	1:33
4.	"Fearless Eyes"	その瞳に恐れの色なし	2:33
5.	"Call of the Ancients"	古の呼び声	2:20
6.	"Time Marches"	刻まれゆく時の果て	2:23
7.	"Wings of Despair"	翼持つ死の遣い	1:40
8.	"The Blade Seeker"	死線を征く者	3:01
9.	"Pure Breeze"	穢れ無き風の調べ	2:07
10.	"Face Your Fate"	目を逸らさずに	2:14
11.	"Confrontation"	対決	2:30
12.	"The Evil Moon"	禍月の夜	2:35
13.	"Bred from the Gap"	狭間より湧き出でし者	1:49
14.	"Sail Over the Storm"	荒海を超えて	2:44
15.	"Blind Loyalty"	迷い無き忠誠	2:36
16.	"The Cursed Image"	呪われし心象	2:13
17.	"The New Legend"	新たなる伝説	2:10
18.	"Labyrinth of Moonlight"	月光の迷宮	3:36
19.	"Through Molten Caves"	灼熱の地脈を抜けて	2:34
20.	"No Regrets"	悔いることなき道行き	3:08
21.	"Ephemeral Dream"	儚く散るが故に	2:18
22.	"Endless Warfare"	果て知らぬ野望	2:32
23.	"Water Dance"	たゆたう水の舞	2:53
24.	"Courage Ablaze"	炎より勇なる者	2:12
25.	"Beyond the Horizon"	地平線の果てに	2:40
26.	"If There Were Any Other Way"	非情なる運命の絆	1:51
27.	"Forsaken Sanctuary"	忘れられし約束の地	2:05
28.	"Catastrophe"	滅びの宴	2:08
29.	"World Distortion"	歪み崩れゆく世界	2:10

Disc 2
No.	Title	Japanese title	Length
1.	"Tales of Souls"	ある魂の遍歴	1:25
2.	"Eternal Wayfarer"	広大なる世界を巡り	1:27
3.	"The Ordeal"	試練の旅路	1:21
4.	"The Intruder"	聖域侵犯	1:21
5.	"Under a Black Curse"	黒き呪詛を辿って	2:43
6.	"Tenderness"	ぬくもりの記憶	0:45
7.	"The Oath"	明日への誓い	1:00
8.	"Teardrops"	哀しみの雫	0:46
9.	"Gaze from Hell"	煉獄の凝視	0:46
10.	"Crisis"	迫り来る危機	0:31
11.	"Frailty, Thy Name Is..."	弱き者、汝の名は…	2:38
12.	"Fatal Chain"	断ち切れぬ鎖	0:57
13.	"Tiptoe"	抜き足差し足	0:31
14.	"Peaceful Days"	安らぎの中に	2:46
15.	"Memento"	想い出の欠片	0:52
16.	"Armed with Valor"	その身に纏うは武勇の装束	1:27
17.	"Battle for the Crown"	栄冠を求めて	1:35
18.	"The Gemstones"	英雄の原石たち	0:56
19.	"Radiant Souls"	煌めく魂の諸相	1:45
20.	"The Lost Chronicle"	失われた年代記	1:06
21.	"The Die is Cast"	賽は投げられた	1:58
22.	"Approaching Tempest"	争嵐の予兆――出撃	1:23
23.	"Symphony of Swords"	剣たちの奏でる戦律	2:47
24.	"Nameless Calamity"	名も無き戦火	4:55
25.	"Upon My Soul"	この宿命に誓って	3:08
26.	"Crimson Feast"	血戦	4:43
27.	"The Hollow Delusion"	虚妄の帳	3:26
28.	"Value of Tranquility"	平和の価値	1:12
29.	"Path of Destiny"	運命は己が胸の内に	6:31
30.	"Healing Winds"	戦士を癒す風	3:25
31.	"Peaceful Days" (piano version)	安らぎの中に（ピアノバージョン）	2:58
32.	"The Oath" (guitar version)	明日への誓い	0:57
33.	"Healing Winds: Reprise"	戦士を癒す風	2:00

== Soulcalibur IV Original Soundtrack ==
Soulcalibur IV Original Soundtrack

Soundtrack album by Various artists
- Released: September 3, 2008
- Genre: Video game soundtrack
- Length: 1:09:23 (Disc 1); 1:07:37 (Disc 2)
- Label: Marvelous Entertainment

Soulcalibur IV Original Soundtrack is the soundtrack album for Soulcalibur IV. It was composed by Namco employees Junichi Nakatsuru, Keiki Kobayashi, Masaharu Iwata, and Hiroyuki Fujita. Its 65 tracks span two discs and have a duration of 2:17:00. The album was published by Marvelous Entertainment on September 3, 2008, with the catalog number MJCD-20132. As with the previous two games in the series, a one-disc, 22-track version of the album was included in the North American strategy guide for the game. It was released on July 22, 2008. Three tracks from the Star Wars films accommodate the three guest characters: The Apprentice, Darth Vader, and Yoda. The tracks are "Duel of the Fates", "The Imperial March," "Qui-Gon's Noble End", and respectively.

Track list

Disc 1
No.	Title	Japanese title	Length
1.	"Distant Thunder"	遠雷	0:35
2.	"Seize Your Destiny"	運命をつかむために	3:04
3.	"Revelation"	太古の黙示	1:31
4.	"The Uncovered History"	見いだされた歴史の舞台	1:37
5.	"Searching For The Truth"	歴史の真実を求めて	2:43
6.	"Immaculate Pledge"	その誓いに一点の穢れなし	3:08
7.	"To The Wind"	風の生まれるところへ	1:52
8.	"Phantasmagoria"	一夜の夢のごとく	3:05
9.	"Valiant Heart"	勇気を内に秘め	2:16
10.	"Tempered Soul"	己が魂を鍛えよ	2:23
11.	"Reign Of Doom"	破滅の座	2:57
12.	"Glacial Colosseum"	氷冠の決闘場	3:02
13.	"Infernal Offering"	贄は捧げられた	2:32
14.	"Indomitable Warrior"	不撓不屈の心	2:49
15.	"Twilight Dwellers"	宵闇に生きる者たち	3:12
16.	"Innocent Vision"	ただ一時、純白の幻	4:06
17.	"Halcyon Harbor"	波路尽き、空は青	2:48
18.	"Lost In The Mirage"	惑いの回廊	2:27
19.	"Gigantesque"	そびえ立つ巨塔	2:56
20.	"Breakthrough"	切り開かざれば道はなし	2:28
21.	"Destiny Will Tell"	宿命は争えず	2:25
22.	"The Supreme Sword"	頂に立つ者	2:51
23.	"Raging Blood"	激しい血潮のたかぶり	1:09
24.	"Confession"	明かされた歴史の断片	0:51
25.	"Fatidic Shadow"	塔の暗示	1:10
26.	"Spark Of Fate"	咲くは火花、散るは命	4:28
27.	"Thanatos"	死は平等なり	3:52
28.	"Survivor's Words"	勝ち残りし者の語り	1:06

Disc 2
No.	Title	Japanese title	Length
1.	"Portrait Of A Warrior"	ある戦士の肖像	3:21
2.	"Infinite Images"	無限の想像力	3:02
3.	"Fateful Encounter"	来るべき戦いの時	1:43
4.	"The Valiant Order"	勇あるもの……	1:14
5.	"The Perfect World"	完全なる世界］	1:05
6.	"Dies Meti"	恐怖の日	0:38
7.	"The Successor"	邪剣を継ぐもの	1:44
8.	"Fate Attested By The Sword"	剣の示した運命	1:10
9.	"Bottomless Thirst"	あくなき欲望	1:14
10.	"The Sword Keeper"	不死の番人	1:12
11.	"Showdown"	決着の時	1:06
12.	"Her Decision"	彼女の結論	0:58
13.	"A Firm Resolution"	揺るがぬ決意	1:10
14.	"The Avenger"	復讐を成す者	1:01
15.	"Unflinching Choice"	迷いなき選択	1:29
16.	"Keeper Of The Balance"	永劫の平衡を保つ者	0:34
17.	"The Unleashed Despair"	解き放たれた絶望	1:05
18.	"Her Master's Way"	師の流儀	0:59
19.	"Deranged Master"	狂気の主	1:24
20.	"Chimeric Feast"	異形たちの宴	1:11
21.	"The Last Lesson"	最後の稽古	1:09
22.	"Realization"	目覚め	1:21
23.	"Restful Wind"	安息の風	1:08
24.	"Righteous Blade"	義を知る者	1:01
25.	"End Of A Journey"	旅の終わりに	1:10
26.	"Light Of Salvation"	救いの光	1:51
27.	"The Eternal Observer"	永久の観察者	1:21
28.	"The King's Sorrow"	王者の哀しみ	1:32
29.	"The Deed Is Done"	偉業は成し遂げられた	1:05
30.	"Story Teller's Bravery"	語り部の勇姿	1:12
31.	"The Iron Maiden"	鋼鉄の淑女	1:08
32.	"Fierce Way Of Life"	その荒々しき生き様	1:08
33.	"Searching For Her Clan"	仲間を求めて	1:05
34.	"Apocalypse"	審判の時	0:57
35.	"Winds And Memories"	追憶は風に舞い	3:50
36.	"Entwined Destiny"	綾なす運命の絆	2:39
37.	"Path Of Destiny"	運命は己が胸の内に	6:40

== Soulcalibur V Original Soundtrack ==
Soulcalibur V Original Soundtrack

Soundtrack album by Various artists
- Released: January 31, 2012
- Genre: Video game soundtrack
- Length: 51:48 (Disc 1); 56:47 (Disc 2); 45:09 (Disc 2)
- Label: Creative Intelligence Arts RECORDS

Soulcalibur V Original Soundtrack is the soundtrack album for Soulcalibur V. It was composed by Junichi Nakatsuru, Hiroki Kikuta, Tomoki Miyoshi, Andrew Aversa, Cris Velasco, Inon Zur, Jillian Aversa, and Jesper Kyd. Its 57 tracks span three discs and have a duration of 2:33:44. The album was published by Creative Intelligence Arts Records on January 31, 2012, with the catalog number SCV-0010112L. A one-disc, 17-track version of the album that included in the collector's edition game, was also released on January 31, 2012.

Track list

Disc 1
No.	Title	Japanese title	Length
1.	"Sword of Resolution"	覚悟もて剣を取り	3:02
2.	"Till Fate Writes My Epitaph"	運命の尽き果てるまで	3:42
3.	"Sleepless: An Untamed Beast"	餓狼は闇に啼く	3:41
4.	"Daybreaker"	曙光の一矢、野を貫き	3:56
5.	"The Invincible Blade"	極みの一刀	3:54
6.	"Tread Ye the Path of Bravery"	しからば義を為すべし	4:05
7.	"Where Springs Not Fail"	咲き誇れ、新たなる華	3:56
8.	"Faster Than a Howling Wind"	響き万雷、封魔の風切り	3:43
9.	"Let My Soul Burn"	魂の燃えさかるままに	3:42
10.	"A High-Spirited Tiger"	奔放なるは虎の申し子	3:42
11.	"Without the Blessing of Fate"	祝福なき血統	3:40
12.	"Master of Edges"	不易の剣聖	3:18
13.	"Virtuous Heart"	その心に偽りの響きなし	3:03
14.	"Sacred Dawn"	真なる夜明け	4:24

Disc 2
No.	Title	Japanese title	Length
1.	"Wings of Sorrow"	悲嘆の翼	3:50
2.	"Mischievous Whispers"	否のさえずり	3:22
3.	"Chainless Disaster"	放たれた災厄	3:16
4.	"Wandering Seer"	星見の彷徨	4:14
5.	"Blood Thirst Concerto"	協奏曲「血の渇き」	3:51
6.	"Amid the Pure Insanity"	光とて差さぬ狂気の底で	4:00
7.	"Samsara: The Wheel of Eternity"	因果のさいはて	3:44
8.	"Brutal Instinct"	滅びへの衝動	3:27
9.	"The Storm Bringer"	さまよえる嵐の王	3:59
10.	"Through the Jaws of Death"	死のあぎとをかすめて	3:37
11.	"Pavor Nocturnus"	夜の領袖	3:27
12.	"Adorned with Evil"	邪なる花輪に飾られて	3:58
13.	"Regalia"	覇者の権能	3:51
14.	"Dance of the Oracle"	宣託の舞踏	4:12
15.	"Venice Rooftops" (SCV mix)	Venice Rooftops (SCV mix)	3:59

Disc 3
No.	Title	Japanese title	Length
1.	"Chaos and Cosmos"	混沌とは秩序	2:45
2.	"The Frontier of History"	まだ見ぬ歴史の舞台へ	2:32
3.	"The Field of Honor"	決闘者たちの舞台	2:00
4.	"Artificer's Fancy"	空想の匠	4:23
5.	"Legend Unveiled"	暴かれた歴史の闇	1:26
6.	"Surge of Darkness"	闇の波動	0:27
7.	"Decisive Clash"	決着の時	1:35
8.	"Nightmare's Demise"	悪夢の崩壊	0:38
9.	"Faith and Arrogance"	信仰と驕り	0:41
10.	"Raid of Brute Force"	野獣の急襲	0:59
11.	"Code Duello"	決闘者の流儀	1:10
12.	"Holy Requisition"	聖の聖なるため	2:11
13.	"Painful Fate"	悲痛なる宿命	1:11
14.	"Gloomy Seduction"	昏い誘惑	1:12
15.	"Evil Omen"	暗雲	1:10
16.	"Home is Faraway"	故郷は遥か彼方に	2:12
17.	"A Looming Threat"	危機の訪れ	0:35
18.	"Burgeoning Darkness"	芽生えた闇	0:37
19.	"Lord of Terror"	恐怖の主	1:14
20.	"Silent Grief"	声なき悲嘆	1:41
21.	"The Brave Shall Carry On"	勇をもて道拓き	1:13
22.	"The Legendary Treasures"	三宝の伝説	0:40
23.	"Mayhem"	乱戦	0:40
24.	"Momentum"	契機	0:44
25.	"Returning Doom"	破滅の再臨	1:42
26.	"The Last Wish"	願いはただひとつ	1:26
27.	"The Siblings' Destiny"	絆の行く末	1:52
28.	"The Breeze at Dawn"	生まれたばかりの風の中で	6:13

== Soulcalibur VI Original Soundtrack ==
Soulcalibur VI Original Soundtrack

Soundtrack album by Various artists
- Released: July 27, 2019
- Genre: Video game soundtrack
- Length: 1:07:50 (Disc 1); 47:50 (Disc 2); 1:00:48 (Disc 3); 1:01:09 (Disc 4)
- Label: SweepRecord
- Producer: Bandai Namco

Soulcalibur VI Original Soundtrack is the soundtrack album for Soulcalibur VI. It was composed by Junichi Nakatsuru, Yoshihito Yano, Syuri Misaki, Yu Sugimoto, Rio Hamamoto, and Yukihiro Jindo. Its 71 tracks span four discs and a total length of 3:56:58. The album was published by SweepRecord on July 27, 2019, with the catalog number SRIN-1161.

Track list

Disc 1
No.	Title	Japanese title	Length
1.	"The Brave New Stage of History"	新たに語られる歴史の舞台	1:37
2.	"Undying Legend"	蘇る伝説	4:39
3.	"Standing Against the Storm"	たとえ嵐吹き荒れようとも	4:19
4.	"Under a Pledge"	その誓約に星霜の陰りなし	4:05
5.	"Darkest Shadow"	闇の枢軸	4:41
6.	"Diabolous Amalgam"	禁忌の混交	4:43
7.	"Following the Wind Trail"	遼遠なる風を追って	4:35
8.	"The Lionhearted"	屈服せざる者	4:23
9.	"Who Dare to Tread"	熱火の難路を行く	4:09
10.	"Moon of Oblivion"	仮初めの月明	4:25
11.	"Myriad Souls"	天を行く億万の魂	4:40
12.	"Deadland Call"	屍骸の手招き	3:50
13.	"Chaos Eclipse"	絶異の侵食	4:09
14.	"Fortune Favors the Brave"	勇気を最後の武器に変えて	4:29
15.	"Lineage of Destiny"	宿命の血脈	5:31
16.	"A Worthy Opponent"	難敵を前にして	0:13
17.	"Onslaught"	突然の襲来	0:58
18.	"Ferrum Recipere"	鉄剣を受け入れよ	1:10
19.	"A Laurel Crown"	勝利の月桂冠	1:14

Disc 2
No.	Title	Japanese title	Length
1.	"Eternal Tales"	永遠に語り継がれる物語	1:40
2.	"Hell on Earth"	漏れ出した地獄の炎	0:55
3.	"The Chronicle of Souls"	語られし魂の行跡	4:05
4.	"Prelude"	魂の序奏	1:46
5.	"Presage of Destiny"	近づく運命の予感	2:21
6.	"Foreshadowed by Darkness"	闇色の予兆	2:57
7.	"Fated Soul"	運命を胸に宿せし者	3:23
8.	"In Full Bloom"	咲き乱れし花々	4:32
9.	"Man of Fortitude"	不屈の魂を持つ男	3:55
10.	"Fidelity in Shrouds"	黒衣の忠剣	4:11
11.	"A Zealous Herald"	狂信の伝導者	4:00
12.	"Crux of Evil"	邪悪の心核	3:30
13.	"Fate's Crossing"	交錯する運命	0:45
14.	"To Overcome Fate"	運命に打ち勝つために	0:50
15.	"The Evil Flame"	瀆神の炎	3:55
16.	"Conviction"	信念の一撃	0:35
17.	"In Memory : To Those Who Shed Blood"	魂の記憶：赤き血を流せし者達へ	4:28

Disc 3
No.	Title	Japanese title	Length
1.	"Destiny in Flux"	うつろいゆく運命	4:20
2.	"Destiny in Flux:Steel Echo"	うつろいゆく運命：鋼の残響	4:26
3.	"Destiny in Flux:Deep Reflection"	うつろいゆく運命：沈思黙考	4:25
4.	"Defiant Soul"	運命に抗う者	4:03
5.	"The Libra of Soul"	揺れ動く魂の天秤	2:57
6.	"The Hunt for the Fissures"	次元の裂け目を探して	3:56
7.	"A Bitter Decision"	苦衷の選択	3:50
8.	"Into the Fray"	争乱の最前線へ	3:58
9.	"Time of Trial"	天与の試練	4:28
10.	"Chasing the Beast"	黒き獣を追って	4:04
11.	"Endless Quest"	永遠の旅路をゆく	3:56
12.	"Unforeseen Challenge"	突然の邂逅	1:51
13.	"An Unexpected Visitor"	意外なる来訪者	1:26
14.	"Avenging Sword"	復讐者の剣	1:23
15.	"Doomsday"	審判の刻	4:29
16.	"Thwarted Ambition"	打ち破られし野望	0:54
17.	"The Nameless Ordeal"	血で紡がれし試練	5:07
18.	"Destiny Unfolds"	明かされた運命	0:35

Disc 4
No.	Title	Japanese title	Length
1.	"Pure Anger"	憤怒の化身	2:58
2.	"Fate at Its Limit"	命運を危機に晒して	2:43
3.	"Inevitable Clash"	避けられぬ一戦	4:06
4.	"Agony"	責めさいなむ苦悩	3:44
5.	"Approaching Hope"	行く末に希望ありて	3:07
6.	"Peace Within"	胸に抱くべき平穏	3:52
7.	"A Lone Soul"	孤独の旅人	3:26
8.	"Gentle Breeze"	優しき風の調べ	3:37
9.	"At the End of a Journey"	遙かなる旅の終わりに	3:05
10.	"Solemn Vow"	誓い立てるべき時	3:25
11.	"Fate Against Her"	運命のしもべたらずば	3:23
12.	"Emerging from the Abyss"	深き淵より生まれし者	3:04
13.	"B for Bravery"	勇気を見せる時は今	3:04
14.	"Days Gone By"	懐かしき日々の思い出	3:31
15.	"A Graceful Soul"	その魂は典雅にして	2:04
16.	"Soul Engraver"	魂の彫像	6:05
17.	"Healing Winds : Reminiscences"	戦士を癒す風：追憶の彼方へ	5:54
