= Save the Queen =

Save the Queen may refer to:

- God Save the Queen, the British and Commonwealth National Anthem
- The name of a powerful sword, whip, or bow in Final Fantasy
- The name of Raphael's ultimate weapon in Soulcalibur II
