= Dance, Voldo, Dance =

2002 music video

- Game: Soulcalibur
- Running time: 6 minutes
- Created by: Chris Brandt
- Directed by: Chris Brandt
- Music by: Nelly (original), Tana Rusitanonta (final)
- Actor control: Chris Brandt, "Msr. M"
- Production company: Bain Street Productions
- Release(s): October 2002

Dance, Voldo, Dance is a machinima-based music video produced in 2002 by Chris Brandt. The video, created using the fighting game Soulcalibur, features two players both controlling the character Voldo, using existing in-game animation to have the characters perform a synchronized dance to the song "Hot in Herre" by musician Nelly. The result of over a week's full-time preparation and training, the video was conceived after Brandt noticed the character's animations and attacks could be triggered in sync with the beat of a song, and the reactions of onlookers to such a display. While several groups demonstrated interest in showcasing the video, complications arose from the copyright holders whose works were involved in creation.

The video has been well received, cited as one of the first examples of machinima-based music videos, and has since spawned several fan-based imitations with Voldo dancing to various songs. Several sources such as The Village Voice have praised the video for its choreography and presentation, while several books and college professors have cited it as a notable example of machinima animation in lectures on the subject. It was also nominated at the 2005 Machinima Film Festival awards for Best Virtual Performance, and served as part of an exhibit for the San Jose Museum of Art.

== Conception and creation ==
In February 2002, Chris Brandt and Jesse Reklaw played Soulcalibur during a party hosted by Landry Walker. Both Brandt and Reklaw were using the Voldo character, but rather than fighting, Reklaw was making the character do herky-jerky moves. Brandt decided to mimic Reklaw's gameplay, resulting in what he describes as "an impromptu dance of sorts". When the party music changed to "Move Bitch", Brandt noticed a consistent time interval for all of Voldo's motions, and had the character's movement follow the beat of the music. Reklaw noticed and followed in rhythm, entertaining other party guests with the results.

In September, Brandt met up with Reklaw and other friends, and the subject turned to what had happened in February. Deciding to demonstrate it, the two played against each other using Voldo again, with the characters "dancing" to various songs. Noticing that everyone was entertained by the homoerotic nature of Voldo's animation, Brandt decided to develop a music video.

In October, realizing he lacked the funds to pursue his bigger art projects, Brandt decided to work on the Voldo video project using the song "Hot in Herre". However, the only partner he had to create the video with was his roommate, M., who initially wanted nothing to do with it. After seeing Brandt work on the concept by himself however, M. agreed to help as long as he remained anonymous, and the project's schedule fit around his drinking habit. Development of the choreography was completed the next day, and the following five days were devoted to producing the video at five-hour intervals for each day, while the music played through the television via a PlayStation 2's audio cable. However, by the fifth day, both realized that the music was actually distracting, and Brandt recorded himself counting out the beat of the song. Using this as the audio track, they were able to complete the project easily, and after editing the video Brandt released two versions online, with the latter utilizing the song "Kiss" by Prince.

In 2004, Brody Condon showed the video at a gaming/machinima conference in Australia. Interest was shown by G4TechTV, MTV, and Microsoft to feature the video on their respective media; however, they hit complications with both the copyright holders of Soulcalibur, Namco, and Nelly, whose agents wanted $100,000 to license the song. To rectify the latter problem, Brandt contacted a musician he had worked with on another project, Tana Rusitanonta, who'd expressed interest in producing his own music for the character, to produce a song that sounded similar to the original without infringing on the copyright, producing the "final" version of the video. However, shortly thereafter Namco explicitly stated they would not license the character for such means, and discussions ceased.

== Critical reception ==
Since its release, Dance, Voldo, Dance has been well received by the public, appearing briefly on the popularity index Popdex's "Top 10". Several fan-made machinima have followed suit, each using the same concept of two Voldo characters dancing to various songs. In 2005, it was nominated for Best Virtual Performance at the Machinima Film Festival. In 2006, from January 21 to April 29 it was featured at the San Jose Museum of Art as part of their "Heavenly Bodies" exhibit.

At the 2006 Machinima Film Festival, Machinima.com founder Hugh Hancock and Academy of Machinima Arts & Sciences founder Paul Marino cited Dance, Voldo, Dance as one of the first examples of machinima-based music videos. The book SwanQuake: The User Manual described it as a difficult form of machinima to characterize, describing it "genre-bending work" and having elements of puppetry, moviemaking, and choreography. Another book, The Machinima Reader, described it as "an ingenious fight-as-dance choreography", citing the "sexualized virtual identity" of the character combined with the original soundtrack. In Developing Interactive Narrative Content, Georgia Institute of Technology assistant professor Michael Nitsche compared the animation to virtual puppetry in that it was rooted solely on in-game animation, yet also used it as an example to illustrate that such material could be entertaining. In Medien Körper Imagination, the motions used in the video were described as both descriptive and often prescriptive, comparing it to time and motion studies.

The Village Voice called it a "virtuoso in-game performance", describing it as one of the most impressive works showcased at 2005 Machinima Film Festival. The book Playing with Videogames called it "extraordinarily skillful and humorous", citing it as both a suspension of the game's normal purpose by players with "parodic humor" and one of the defining moments in machinima. In a study of video games as an art form, University of Montreal lecturer Martin Picard cited it as an example of machinima and performance, calling it "perfectly choreographed" and a "superb example of gameplay and performance". University of California professor Michael Mateas stated he enjoyed the dance performance of the presentation in light of more narrative forms of machinima, adding that it was enhanced by Voldo's "S&M attire".
