= Talim (Soulcalibur) =

- Soulcalibur character
- Talim in Soulcalibur II
- First game: Soulcalibur II (2002)
- Voiced by: English: Julie Parker (Soulcalibur II) Kira Buckland (Soulcalibur VI); Japanese: Yukari Tamura

In-universe information
- Weapon: Elbow blades
- Origin: Visayan Islands
- Nationality: Filipino

Talim (Japanese: タリム, Hepburn: Tarimu) is a character in the Soulcalibur series of fighting games. Created by Namco's Project Soul division, she first appeared in Soulcalibur II and in most subsequent titles for the series. The Filipino daughter of a shaman and trained to be a Priest of the Wind, after encountering a fragment of the cursed sword Soul Edge she travels the world to return it to its rightful place. In English, Talim has been voiced by Julie Parker and Kira Buckland, while in Japanese she is voiced by Yukari Tamura.

The character has received positive reception since her debut, warmly received as the first Filipino character in video games and a popular subject of cosplay amongst fans. Her character design has also been praised, described as "almost too cute" for the franchise and for the attention to detail in her clothing. However, this has also received some backlash due to her young age, particular for how sexualized many of her outfits are. University of Delaware professor Rachael Hutchinson meanwhile examined Talim's design through the scope of Japanese views towards other Asian cultures, and also how players reacted to a shorter character against much larger opponents in the context of the Soulcalibur series.

== Conception and design ==
As a character introduced in Soulcalibur II, Talim's weapons, a pair of elbow blades, were decided upon before other aspects of the character were. Originally considered for the first Soulcalibur, the weapons were selected to be unique amongst the others characters' weapons in the title. Her design and concept were built to revolve around them, starting with gender, then physical measurements, and lastly background details. Once established her appearance and movement were fleshed out and rendered as a 3D model by a design team that worked solely on the character. Talim was then animated by a motion designer using motion capture and working directly with the team. During this phase the team additionally worked with the Soulcalibur story creators, refining the character's own role in the plot as needed throughout development.

Talim's weapons were built around the concept of dual-weapon usage, with special emphasis that while bladed, the weapons themselves were not actual tonfa, intended more as ritual items used in ceremonial dances. During development it was considered to allow them to transform and be sentient, however the idea was abandoned. In artwork of an early character lineup, her weapons were significantly larger and extending the length of her whole arm. The weapons were shortened as development progressed, due to concerns that their length should cause her "stomach to be sliced open" when she used them and how they restricted her character movement. However, this iteration made it farther into the design process, as finalized concept sketches of her outfit shown in The Art of Soulcalibur II feature the longer blades.

Talim's character concept was designed around the idea of introducing a young female character that the developers felt the series lacked, though due to her design some of the development team confused her for a boy. Early character drafts also gave her a more "determined" personality, emphasized by her facial expressions. Her outfits were based on a "Priestess of the Wind" motif, and meant to represent attire worn by her village during rituals, while a "fairy" motif was also incorporated into her character to emphasize her individuality. For her appearance in Soulcaibur VI they focused on a refinement of her costume from Soulcalibur II, incorporating a large hat and ribbons into the design to better emphasize the wind theme. She stands at 144 centimetres (4 ft 8 1/2 in) tall, making her the second shortest playable character in the series, and has a bust size of 70 cm (28 in).

== Appearances ==
Talim was introduced in Soulcalibur II, growing up in a South-East Asian village in the Philippine Visayan Islands. The only daughter of the local shaman, she was trained to be a Wind Priestess, which relied on two elbow blades as part of its ceremonial dance. When a stranger brought a shard of the cursed sword Soul Edge to her village, she sensed the danger from the fragment and left her village to return it where it belonged. Talim later appeared in subsequent entries in the Soulcalibur series with the exception of Soulcalibur V, each time venturing to find the source of Soul Edge, or in the case of Soulcalibur IV preventing fellow character Yun-Seong from falling under its influence. In English she was voiced by Julie Parker until the release of Soulcalibur IV where she was voiced by Kira Buckland, while in Japanese for all appearances she is voiced by Yukari Tamura.

Her movement and fighting style were designed around her culture and a bird-theme, emphasizing close horizontal strikes upon opponents as well as freedom of movement. Talim is very quick and evasive, with moves such as "Wind Sault" allowing her to close the distance between herself and the opponent quickly. She has additional moves that allow her to either stun the opponent temporarily or knock them down, with former allowing her to chain into subsequent attacks and apply consecutive stun. However this also makes her a more difficult character to use, and causes her gameplay to have to rely on tricks, gimmicks, and stuns to do significant damage.

== Critical reception ==
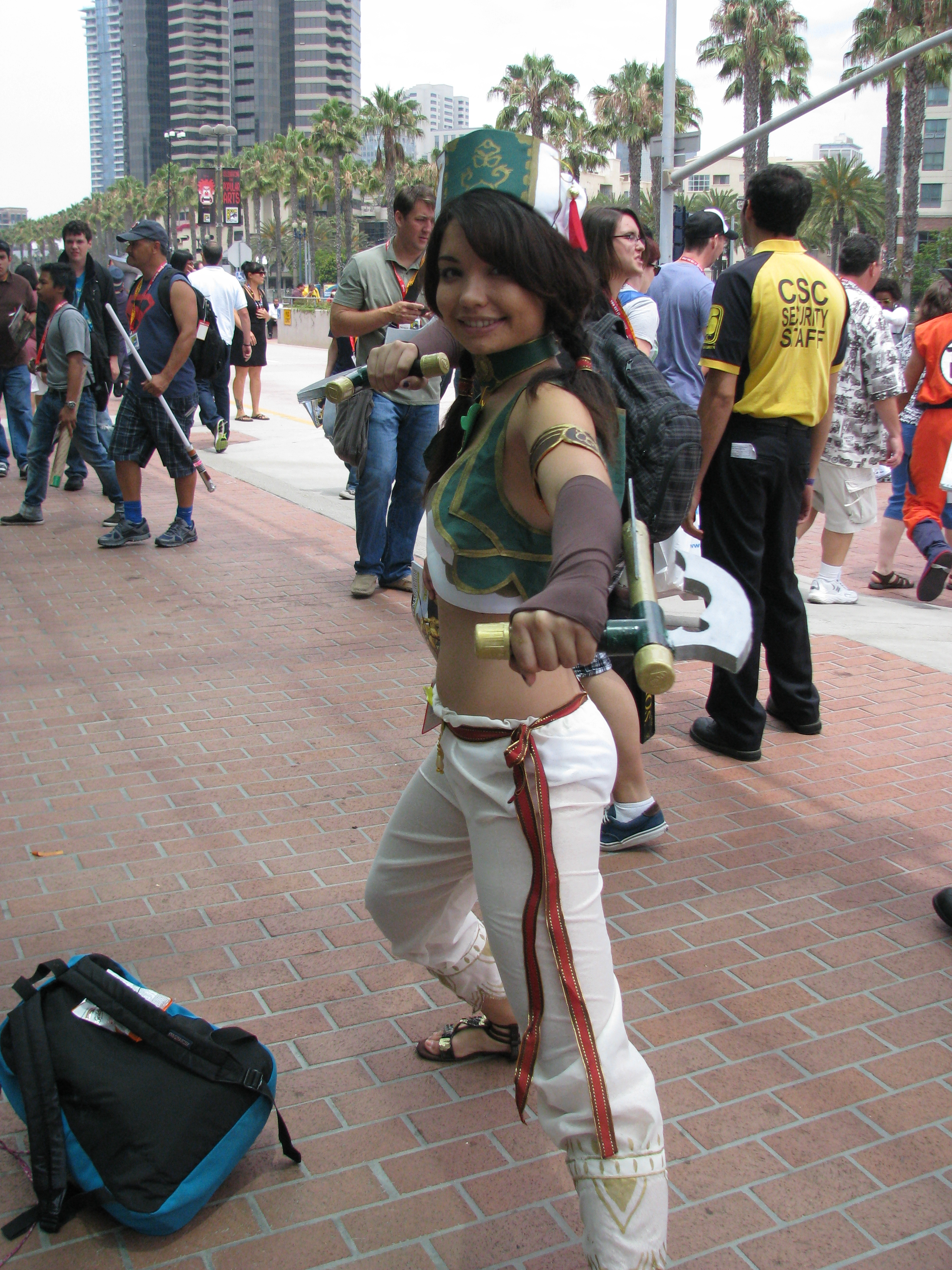
Talim's design has made her a frequent subject of cosplay by fans

Described by The Art of Game Characters as having "hints of manga in those big eyes", Talim has been positively received since her debut. In 2015 she was voted the most popular Soulcalibur character in the West in an official poll by Namco Bandai, and has been cited as a popular subject of cosplay in literature. GameSpy's Christian Nutt stated Talim's "unpredictable nature" made her interesting, though added "she's almost too cute to fit in" alongside the other characters. Tim Rogers in a review for Insert Credit called Talim "the cutest of the young girl characters [in Soulcalibur II] by far," and stated a preference for her symmetrical outfits. Hungarian magazine MultiPlay described her fighting style as one of the most unique introduced in fighting games in the last quarter century, and felt her "lightning-quick" attacks made her the most interesting character in Soulcalibur II. The book The Rough Guide to Videogames meanwhile praised the physical diversity she brought to the cast compared to more voluptuous characters in thee series, feeling it was one of aspects that made Soulcalibur II great.

She has also been cited as the first visible Filipino character in video games, and has been described in a study of the series' characters as "created for the Philippine market". The book Open World Empire: Race, Erotics, and the Global Rise of Video Games noted that her appearance and ability to control the wind gave her ethnic background "a campy cultural 'fragrance' that invites humorous parodies and irreverent performances as well as objectifying gazes," but due to the race's scarcity in video games, she also garnered pride. Game writer Pat Miller in an interview for Polygon stated regarding her cultural background he "was really stoked to see that...I like having those points of identification". Himself part Filipino, he added that her inclusion made it easier to bring new people into the fighting game community.

Talim's image has also been utilized in material revolving around her sex appeal as a female character, by publications such as Play and PSM. Gadget Review writer Kristie Bertucci stated that while she was the "girliest" character of the franchise, "that doesn't mean she doesn't have a sexy side to her", naming her one of the hottest female characters in gaming due to being "built quite nicely with curves in all the right places" and her attire. Matt Sainsbury of DigitalDownloaded.net in multiple articles praised her, calling her "the perfect fighting game character" due to her high speed and how she added to the series' fanservice. He particularly praised her as a "nice, normal-proportioned girl who just happens to wear a harem-style outfit", a clothing style he felt represented "a sensuality and exotic sexuality that is simultaneously more subtle and more typical" of other examples in gaming such as bikinis and schoolgirl uniforms.

However, some criticisms were raised against the character's sexualization. Brazilian Professor Georgia da Cruz Pereira stated that despite representing "a bit of differentiation compared to most of the characters in the game" due to a lack of breasts and hips coupled with her young age, "she is still inserted within a context of sexualization and standardization of the female body" in the series. The Village Voice described her as "mixing it up in see-through pants and a bra top", further calling her a "troubling" example of over-sexualization and costume fetish in the game. Maddy Myers in an article for Kotaku echoed these concerns, stating in Soulcalibur VI she "wears a tiny X-shaped tube top that criss-crosses over her nipples and a string bikini bottom that pokes out of low-slung shorts. Putting the series' [...] youngest and most innocent characters in bikinis seems unnecessary."

Contrary to both viewpoints, University of Delaware professor Rachael Hutchinson noted elements of her design suggest innocence, namely the pink ribbons in her hair, and observed that Talim's costume was not as revealing as other female characters within the series. While discussing her design, she stated that as the series progressed Talim's black hair shifted to a more blue hue, and believes this was meant to signify her as the "Other" to Japanese viewers: Asian, but not Japanese. In another study, Hutchinson emphasized Talim's height against the series' much taller male characters, stating that being able to fight them with her "inverts stereotypical gender expectations and provides entertainment through deviation from the norm", due to the expectation male opponents should win due to their superior size.
