= Independents (film) =

- Directed by: Chris Brandt
- Narrated by: James C. Kaufman
- Release date: 2007
- Running time: 77 minutes
- Country: United States

Independents is a documentary film directed by Chris Brandt that explores the creative process and the artistic spirit. It is narrated by James C. Kaufman, and features interviews with over two dozen comic book creators, including Robert Williams, Kevin Eastman, Eric Powell, and Wendy Pini.

The film was screened as an independent film at the 2008 San Diego Comic-Con.
