= Voldo =

Fictional character in Soulcalibur franchise

- Soulcalibur character
- Voldo in Soulcalibur II
- First game: Soul Edge (1995)
- Designed by: Koji Mitsunaga

In-universe information
- Weapon: Dual jamadhar katars
- Origin: Palermo, Kingdom of Sicily
- Nationality: Italian (Sicilian)

Voldo (Japanese: ヴォルド, Hepburn: Vorudo) is a character in the Soulcalibur series of video games. Created by Namco's Project Soul division, he first appeared in Soul Edge, and later in all games of the Soulcalibur series with the exception of Soulcalibur Legends. Servant to a long-dead weapons merchant, Voldo guards his treasure vault, attacking intruders while occasionally wandering out in search of a cursed sword named Soul Edge. Designed by Aya Takemura and Takuji Kawano around his dual hand katars, Voldo went through several designs, and in the early design phases was called "Psycho Murder". Having no spoken dialogue and instead strictly moaning or hissing deeply while fighting an opponent, his high mobility and flexibility influenced his outfits throughout the series, with several designed to take advantage of his unique traits.

Voldo is considered one of the most prominent characters in the series as well as one of its mainstays, his likeness having been used for merchandise and promotional material related to the series. Animated by Naotake Hirata utilizing a mix of handmade animation and motion capture, his movements coupled with his appearance have led him to be described as one of the most horrific and unsettling characters in fighting games. As a whole, Voldo has drawn prominent reactions from both games journalists and scholars, with some of the latter describing him as either a positive or negative example of sexuality in gaming.

== Conception and design ==
As a character introduced in Soul Edge, Voldo's weapons, dual hand katars designed to be unique amongst the other weapons in the game, were selected before other elements of the character. His design and concept were then built to revolve around it, starting with gender, then physical measurements, and lastly background details. During Voldo's development, several alternate designs were considered, ranging from a balding, long haired man with a goatee to a rich nobleman wielding a katar on his right hand and a sickle in his left. Early drafts were dubbed "Psycho Murder" before the character was properly named and the design both slimmed down and simplified. As with all the characters, after his appearance and movement were fleshed out by a concept artist, he was rendered as a 3D model by a design team that worked solely on him. During this phase the team additionally worked with the Soul Edge story creators, refining the character's own role in the plot as needed throughout development.

Unlike other characters in the series, a majority of Voldo's movements were created from Naotake Hirata's imagination and not motion capture. However the head of Team Soul's motion capture department, Kento Kojima, noticed one particular actor working with them was highly flexible and able to mimic Voldo. Impressed, Kojima utilized him in motion capture sessions for some of the character's animations for Soulcalibur III, stating in a later interview, "I was astonished that a human being could actually move like that. It left quite an impression on me. You probably can't tell which part is motion capture and what was just animated by hand by our animator."

Standing at 183 centimetres (6 ft 0 in) tall, he appears as a thin bald man, with straps circling his head to cover his eyes and mouth, with pale skin to give him a more 'alien' appearance. A skin tight leather outfit covers his body, taking design cues from BDSM bondage gear and according to lead character illustrator Takuji Kawano represents his devotion to his master. His outfits throughout the series have retained these elements, sometimes adding a mask, and are often modeled after a particular theme (such as a spider or seasons in Soulcalibur V). Jester design elements are commonly utilized for his alternative outfits also such as a motley pattern to his attire or cap with dangling elements, or alternatively multitudes of large spikes protruding from the various straps, including those on his face. Starting with Soulcalibur III, Voldo's outfits were designed to be reversible due to the character's ability to attack from both the front and the back, and often included themes of duality, such as "squire and noble" or "man and woman" with each side of the outfit representing a different aspect.

== Appearances and gameplay ==
As introduced in the 1996 video game Soul Edge, Voldo was the right-hand man of Vercci, an Italian weapons merchant who desired the powerful sword Soul Edge for his collection of rare weapons. While searching for it, the Italian Wars broke on Italy with Vercci's possessions being the first targets. Angered, Vercci moved his remaining wealth to an uninhabited island off the coast of Sicily and started work on a large vault. After construction was completed, Voldo was instructed to slay the sailors to prevent the location of Vercci's "Money Pit" being revealed. Voldo remained sealed underground to guard the tomb, becoming blind and insane over time. Years later, Voldo would hear his master's voice in his mind commanding him to search for Soul Edge once again, and left the tomb to pursue it. While Voldo returns for each subsequent entry in the series with the exception of Soulcalibur Legends his story remains relatively the same, either attempting to recover Soul Edge for his long-dead master or seeking to retrieve items stolen from the Money Pit while it is unguarded. In several entries, Voldo is manipulated by the sentient spirit residing in Soul Edge, believing it to be his master Vercci commanding him, and has temporarily served it as a lesser antagonist in the story. Outside of the Soulcalibur series, Voldo is featured in the collectible card game Universal Fighting System, and mobile card game Outcast Odyssey.

Voldo does not speak, and instead communicates by hissing or moaning, and attacks using either his katars or by thrusting his body into his target. His gameplay revolves around his high flexibility and mobility, able to switch to various stances such as walking on all fours or rolling towards the opponent at high velocity. This has led him to be described as one of the most unpredictable and versatile characters in the game, able to attack at medium distance and having a higher movement speed than many characters. His particular stances either enhance his defensiveness such as his "Blind" stance or in the case of his "Mantis Crawl" stance prevent him from being able to guard against attacks in exchange for increased mobility. Voldo also has the ability to attack enemies behind him directly, an aspect the development team called his signature move. It has been noted that he lacks attacks that can "pressure" or "rushdown" the opponent, making him more difficult to use and requiring players have a full understanding of his move repertoire.

== Promotion and reception ==
Voldo's animations were developed with a mix of motion capture and 3D modeling, and have been a significant point of discussion

Namco released a Taki key chain figurine and a standing clock in its 1996 Soul Edge line, among other items such as window shades and table mats. In August 2003, Todd McFarlane Productions released a Voldo sculpture amongst a set of five based on characters from Soulcalibur II. The immobile figure was modeled after his primary outfit and stood six inches tall with a base. In 2006, Namco released a Voldo figurine as part of a Soulcalibur III set based upon his promotional artwork for the game. While not posable, the PVC figure came with three interchangeable weapons for it to hold. An alternate color version was later released in a secondary set. His likeness was additionally used as the basis for a costume for Sackboy in LittleBigPlanet 3, as part of a Soulcalibur themed costume pack for the title.

Voldo's attire and unusual fighting style has been a source of discussion regarding the character by several publications. Called "a pastiche of every Satanist stereotype imaginable" by Mark Spiegler of The New York Times due to his attire and weaponry, he further compared his movements to a go-go dancer and added that Voldo was "perhaps the oddest character ever to appear in this genre." Game Vortex reviewer Robert Perkins more simply described him as "a warrior that can best be described as martial artist/contortionist meets Edward Scissorhands." IGN's Jesse Schedeen noted Voldo "isn't a man so much as a twisted mass of writhing muscle, all wrapped up and held together in 16th-Century bondage gear." He further stated that while Voldo was "completely insane", it was part of the character's appeal and what helped him return time and again to the series. Daniel Kurland in an article for Bloody Disgusting named Voldo one of the scariest characters from fighting games, drawing comparisons to Street Fighter characters Vega and noted his blindness and inability to speak "makes him feel more like the monster that he looks." In an in-depth study for Polygon, Patrick Gill described Voldo as a monster "introduced to unsettle the audience's normie sensibilities", drawing comparisons to characters like the cenobites from Clive Barker's Hellraiser series. He further described the character as graceful, setting him apart from a lot of other male fighting game characters and represented the idea of fighters not "forced into a masculine mold". John Warren of Fanbyte heavily praised his movement and design, stating of the latter that there was little that didn't feel deliberate, and that "Voldo's blindness is not weakness, but strength. Voldo's pain is beauty, turned outward into an S&M kaleidoscope. Voldo's silence is paralyzing. Voldo is Soulcalibur's greatest creation."

Several published works have provided more in-depth examinations of the character. In the paper Reflexivity as Entertainment: Early Novels and Recent Video Games, Christina Lupton and Peter McDonald noted he challenged simple readings of entrenched stereotypes, stating his "sado-masochistic and sexualized appearance makes the player uncomfortably aware of the conventions governing depictions of perfectly muscled men and women with cartoon breasts." On the other hand, University of Delaware professor Rachel Hutchinson cited Voldo as an example of a 'deviant' stereotype, noting the contrast between other series characters own insanity and how his is reflected sexually through his clothes and mannerisms, and also a stereotype of how Japan perceives the males of Western cultures through his muscular body and large weaponry. In a later study involving students, Hutchinson noted their reactions of describing Voldo as "masochist or sexual deviant", though noted despite being a "monster" character, he was a popular pick among the students "even though his strangeness of appearance and movement made for a clear sense of disjunction and non-identification between player and character. In the book Affect and Embodied Meaning in Animation, Sylvie Bissonnette described Voldo's animations as exploring psychomania, pointing out the gracefulness of his regular animations in contrast to his insect-like attacks, and added "Perceived as a freak, Voldo's performances of both balanced and twisted contrapposti can symbolize his hybrid nature [...] Voldo successfully wrestles opposites, namely grace and strength, human and cyborg, biped and insect, and dancing and contorting." Game design lecturer Michael Anthony DeAnda stated Voldo "doesn't fit society's gender norms", further calling him a "little ray of hope" in his life due to his design and mannerisms, how he contrasts against other male characters in the game, and can serve as an example to others looking for games that model or explore queer experiences.

In a 2002 poll by Namco prior to the release of Soul Calibur II regarding their favorite character, Voldo placed third, with 13% of the tally. That same year Chris Brandt while playing Soulcalibur at a party with a friend took notice that Voldo's movements could be timed to the music at said party. Building upon the concept, they recorded similar footage as a video titled Dance, Voldo, Dance, which is now recognized as one of the first examples of machinima-based music videos.
