= Soul Edge =

1996 video game

- Japanese arcade flyer
- Developer: Project Soul
- Publishers: Namco; PlayStation: NA: Namco Hometek; EU: Sony Computer Entertainment
- Director: Teruaki Konishi
- Producer: Masuya Oishi
- Designers: Hiroaki Yotoriyama; Koh Onda; Takayasu Yanagihara
- Programmer: Shinobu Nimura
- Artists: Hiroshi Kuwabara; Tarō Okamoto; Kouji Mitsunaga
- Composers: Takayuki Aihara; Takanori Otsuka; PlayStation; Masumi Itō; Benten Maru; Aki Hata; Taku Iwasaki
- Series: Soulcalibur
- Platforms: Arcade, PlayStation
- Release: Arcade: JP: September 13, 1995; WW: February 20, 1996 (Note: Some magazines claimed a premature release date of December 1995.); WW: May 16, 1996 (Ver. II); PlayStation: JP: December 20, 1996; NA: January 15, 1997; PAL: May 1, 1997
- Genre: Fighting
- Modes: Single-player, multiplayer
- Arcade system: System 11

Soul Edge (Note: Japanese: ソウルエッジ, Hepburn: Sōru Ejji) is a 1995 fighting game developed and published by Namco for arcades. It is the first installment in the Soulcalibur series. Introduced at the JAMMA trade show in November 1995, the full arcade game was released on February 20, 1996 (Soul Edge) and May 16, 1996 (Soul Edge Ver. II) on System 11 hardware, the same board used by Tekken and Tekken 2. Later in December, an upgraded and expanded version of the game was ported to the PlayStation; this version was renamed Soul Blade outside Japan and released in 1997.

Soul Edge is a 3D fighting game and was the second such game to be based on weapons, following Battle Arena Toshinden (itself preceded by the 2D Samurai Shodown series). The plot centers upon the eponymous sword, rumored to offer unlimited power to anyone who can find and wield it, leading to nine warriors attempting to pursue the tenth who is rumored to have the sword. The game was a commercial and critical success, with praise given to graphics, gameplay and characters. It was followed up with Soulcalibur in July 1998.

== Gameplay ==
Gameplay screenshot of a fight between Taki and Voldo

Soul Edge was created prior to the introduction of the so-called 8-Way Run. The characters can sidestep to either side by double-tapping down to move to the foreground or tapping down then up to the background. The jump maneuver (which in Soulcalibur is more like a hop) moves the player higher into the air, even allowing it to pass above the opponent (much like in Tekken). The game uses an active block system performed by pressing the block button, and a combat system based on the three attack buttons: horizontal attack, vertical attack, and kick.

Character moves retain a feel of Namco's Tekken series. Each character has one or two slow but unblockable attacks. Each character is also capable of performing one or two "Critical Edge" attacks, consisting of a long series of linked hits, usually ending in a strong high attack. These moves require the input of a special combination of two parts: they are activated by pressing all three attack buttons together, and if it connects, the player has the chance of extending the combo with a character-specific sequence, which must be input during the attack. This attack depletes one-third of the Weapon Gauge when used.

The Weapon Gauge is a life bar for the character's equipped weapon. Each time the player blocks an attack, the bar depletes. If the bar is totally emptied, the weapon is lost and the character is forced to fight unarmed. The unarmed move-lists are the same for every character. Another feature that was removed from Soulcalibur's engine is a rock paper scissors situation when two characters strike at the same time, locking their weapons; those who press the correct button have the advantage.

Soul Edge uses an optional offensive block maneuver called the "Guard Impact" that allows players to intercept incoming attacks and push them back, resulting in a momentary opportunity for a free counterattack. Opponents, however, are also able to return a Guard Impact after receiving a Guard Impact, allowing for stalemate clashes until one opponent missed the subsequent timing. This gameplay feature is expanded in future Soul series games.

The game uses the ring out system, which is a forcible maneuver that ejects the opponent from the arena and gains an automatic victory for the round. To achieve a ring out, a character must be knocked outside the ring by an enemy (the player cannot accidentally or deliberately get a ring out by hopping out of the ring). The only exception to this rule is Cervantes and Inferno (known in this game as SoulEdge), who can get a ring out by themselves upon performing a certain special attack, as long as they are near the edge of the arena.

== Plot and characters ==
Soul Edge's events take place in the year 1583. The game tells the tale of warriors searching for the ultimate sword, "Soul Edge". It has been given many names throughout history, such as "The Sword of Salvation", "The Sword of Heroes", and "The Ultimate Sword", among others. Many strong warriors searched for years, but very few actually found it. The sword, currently in the form of a twin pair of long swords, appeared mysteriously in an auction. It was taken by the dreaded pirate Cervantes de Leon and nothing is known of his fate thereafter. Presently, nine warriors from around the world (Hwang, Li Long, Mitsurugi, Rock, Seong Mi-na, Siegfried, Sophitia, Taki, and Voldo) search for the sword for different reasons. Some desire its power, others want revenge. Some, believing that it is a benevolent sword, crave its support. Others, knowing of its evil nature, seek its destruction. Nothing is known for certain about the sword, except for one thing: it brings misfortune to those seeking it. What many do not know is that the sword's power is evil, feeding upon the souls of not only its victims but its wielder as well.

== Development and release ==
Soul Edge was developed as an experiment by Namco to explore the possibilities of a weapon-based fighting game; Samurai Shodown was one of the first of this type, while Battle Arena Toshinden was the first in 3D. Soul Edge was the first motion capture based video game created by using passive optical system markers.

Soul Edge was initially released in arcades in 1996. A Gamest Mook series guide book (GMC-30) was published by Shinseisha on April 30, 1996.

A couple of months later, Namco released a fixed version, labeled Soul Edge Ver. II. Hwang (initially a palette swap of Mitsurugi with slight move changes, unlockable in Ver. 1) was promoted to playable by default with a new move list, Cervantes became playable, Guard Impacts and Air Combos were implemented, all the characters received upgraded move lists, and new stages were added. The overseas PlayStation version was renamed Soul Blade to avoid potential complications due to EDGE Games' earlier "EDGE" trademark.

=== PlayStation ===
On December 20, 1996, Soul Edge was ported to the Sony PlayStation for the Japanese market. A limited special edition came with the Namco Joystick controller. An official tribute book Soul Edge Official Fan Book (ソウルエッジ オフィシャルファンブック／年代記) was published in the Chronicle series by Famitsu on March 31, 1997.

The port kept the Soul Edge Ver. II roster of ten characters and added five unlockable characters, including SoulEdge, the final boss of the game. Other PlayStation-specific features include:

- A new costume for each character, chosen from various works sent by fans, giving each one a total of three different costumes, plus two color variations for the Player 1 and Player 2 costumes. It also includes—besides the standard Arcade mode—VS mode, Survival, Team Battle, Time Attack, and Training modes.
- A new RPG-styled mode called Edge Master mode, which works as a kind of story mode for the ten initial characters. The mode presents the selected character's story as a book, while the player moves in a map to various locations and fights in battles, sometimes with handicap rules. Generally, each chapter of the book rewards the player with a weapon.
- An opening CGI cinematic and individual endings done using the game's engine rather than still images as in its sequels Soulcalibur and Soulcalibur II. Each of the ten normally selectable characters have two endings, usually one happy ending and another tragic ending. These endings are accessible by pressing a special button/button sequence during certain times, indicated by black bars moving away, while others involve a short minigame, such as Mitsurugi avoiding gunshots. This type of ending was finally brought back in Soulcalibur III.
- The inclusion of seven extra weapons per character, which have different designs and statistics, composed of Power (inflicts more damage), Defense (receives less damage), Strength (damage dealt with enemy's weapon gauge), Durability (resistance of player's weapon gauge), and Weight (changes character's speed). Certain weapons also have a special ability, such as the ability to damage through defense or restore/drain the player's health.
- The inclusion of three different in-game soundtracks to choose from: the original arcade soundtrack, a studio-recorded version of the arcade soundtrack called "Arrange Soundtrack" and the Khan Super Session, made expressly for the home version.
- In the English version, all non-Asian characters have their English voice as default. (The concept of speaking different languages was followed by Tekken 4 since the character Julia Chang from Tekken 3 speaks in her ending.)

Versions labeled Soul Blade came out in 1997. In the North American version, the opening cutscene where Sophitia would have been nude is censored. In the European version, Li Long's pair of nunchaku were changed to a three-section staff, since BBFC guidelines at the time banned any depiction of nunchaku.

=== Soundtracks ===
Two soundtrack CDs were released for the game: Soul Edge Original Soundtrack - Khan Super Session and Super Battle Sound Attack Soul Edge.

== Reception ==
Reception

Aggregate scores
Aggregator	Score
GameRankings	91% (PlayStation)
Metacritic	89/100 (PlayStation)

Review scores
Publication	Score
AllGame	4.5/5 (PlayStation)
Computer and Video Games	3/5 (Arcade)
Electronic Gaming Monthly	8/10, 8/10, 8.5/10, 8.5/10 (PlayStation)
Famitsu	8/10, 9/10, 8/10, 9/10 (PlayStation)
GameFan	292/300 (PlayStation)
GameSpot	8.3/10 (PlayStation)
Hyper	90% (PlayStation)
IGN	8.3/10 (PlayStation)
Next Generation	5/5 (Arcade); 4/5 (PlayStation)
PlayStation Official Magazine – UK	8/10 (PlayStation)
Dengeki PlayStation	90/100, 90/100, 90/100, 95/100

=== Arcade ===
In Japan, Game Machine listed Soul Edge as the second most successful arcade game of March 1996. On the annual 1996 Gamest chart, Soul Edge was the 20th highest-grossing arcade game in Japan that year. The arcade game was more successful in the United States, where it was one of the top five highest-grossing arcade conversion kits of 1996. Despite this, it was not able to achieve the same level of arcade success as Namco's popular Tekken series. According to Next Generation magazine, Soul Edge "enjoyed less success than it deserved" in arcades.

Next Generation reviewed the arcade version of Soul Edge Version II, rating it four stars out of five, and stated that "there is still the slight control delay, but character movement is still fluid and seamless, and the trailing slashes of light in the wake of weapon movement is as gorgeous as ever." The PlayStation conversion, Soul Blade, was a bestseller in the UK. Due to its popularity, the game has been re-released as part of the PlayStation Greatest Hits, the PlayStation Platinum range, and the PlayStation The Best series.

=== PlayStation ===
The PlayStation game received very positive reviews. It holds aggregated scores of 91% on GameRankings and 89/100 on Metacritic, including high ratings by IGN ("extremely fun, and has just enough new elements to make it worth playing multiple times"), and GameSpot ("a great fighting game with its share of flaws"). Next Generation praised it for "filling in all the blanks with great gameplay, superb characters, unique graphics, and combines them into one solid package." They later commended the PlayStation port for retaining all the characters, levels, graphics, and gameplay from the arcade version. GameFan called it "without a doubt the most stunning graphical fighting feast ever to grace any console." The four reviewers of Electronic Gaming Monthly particularly applauded the full motion video intro and the new story mode. They awarded it "Best Intro" in their 1998 Video Game Buyer's Guide. A reviewer for GamePro stated: "Bow down to the new king of fighters, and the first gotta-play-it game of the year."

In 1997, PSM named Soul Edge as the fourth top game on the PlayStation, and Electronic Gaming Monthly listed the PlayStation version as a runner-up for "Fighting Game of the Year" (behind Street Fighter Collection) and "Best Music" (behind PaRappa the Rapper). PSU listed this game as the sixth "PSone classic" most deserving to be remade for the PlayStation 3 in 2011. That same year, Complex ranked Soul Edge as the 19th best fighting game of all time.

The PlayStation version's opening sequence won the SIGGRAPH '97 award for the best game video of 1996.
