= Soulcalibur II =

2002 video game

- Developer: Project Soul
- Publishers: JP: Namco; NA: Namco Hometek; EU: Electronic Arts (PS2, Xbox); EU: Nintendo (GCN); WW: Namco Bandai Games (HD)
- Directors: Jin Okubo; Yoshitaka Tezuka
- Producer: Hiroaki Yotoriyama
- Programmer: Shinobu Nimura
- Artist: Takuji Kawano
- Writer: Yoshihiro Nakagawa
- Composers: Junichi Nakatsuru; Yoshihito Yano; Asuka Sakai; Rio Hamamoto
- Series: Soulcalibur
- Platforms: Arcade, GameCube, PlayStation 2, Xbox, PlayStation 3, Xbox 360
- Release: July 10, 2002: Arcade; JP: July 10, 2002; NA: Q3 2002 GameCube, PlayStation 2, & Xbox; JP: March 27, 2003; NA: August 26, 2003; EU: September 26, 2003 HD Online PlayStation 3; NA: November 19, 2013; EU: November 20, 2013; JP: February 20, 2014 Xbox 360; WW: November 20, 2013
- Genre: Fighting
- Modes: Single-player, multiplayer
- Arcade system: Namco System 246

Soulcalibur II (Note: Japanese: ソウルキャリバーII, Hepburn: Sōrukyaribā Tsū) is a 2002 fighting game developed and published by Namco. It is the third installment in the Soulcalibur series of weapon-based fighting games as the sequel to Soulcalibur (1998). Originally intended to be released on Sega's NAOMI arcade board, the game was built on the Namco System 246 board before being ported to the PlayStation 2, GameCube, and Xbox home consoles.

The game's plot revolves around the legendary weapon Soul Edge having been shattered into pieces, with different characters seeking to collect all the pieces to gain possession of the complete weapon or to destroy it once and for all. Compared to Soulcalibur, Soulcalibur II had improvements in graphics and the game system and introduced several new and guest characters.

The game was a critical and commercial success, with the introduction of guest characters to the series, particularly Link on the GameCube version, being acclaimed by critics and audiences alike, and considered to be one of the greatest video games ever made. A high-definition port, titled Soulcalibur II HD Online, based on the PlayStation 2 version, was released for the PlayStation 3 and Xbox 360 in 2013. The GameCube version was re-released as a launch game on the Nintendo Classics service on the Nintendo Switch 2 in 2025. It received a sequel, Soulcalibur III (2005).

== Gameplay ==
A fight between Raphael and Taki on the GameCube version

Key game system improvements include an easier "step" and "avoid" systems, arena walls (rather than ring out ability on all sides) and wall-specific moves, a three-step Soul Charge system, a clash system that is used when two attacks hit each other simultaneously resulting in a white flash, Guard Break attacks which put a blocking player into a post guard-impact state, just frame moves awarding additional hits to players who can time their command inputs well and a revised Guard Impact system that removes height-based Impact moves and instead uses a more unified system (high and mid attacks are countered using Repels, mid and low attacks are countered using Parries).

Soulcalibur II includes the same modes of play as most fighting games: Arcade, Versus Battle, Team Battle (similar to Arcade, but with teams of up to 3 characters and without cutscenes or endings), Versus Team Battle (with teams of up to 8 characters), Time Attack (where the player has to race against the clock to set records), Survival and Practice. There are also "Extra" versions of these modes, intended to allow the use of Extra Weapons and unlockable stages. A point worth mentioning is that the 7th battle in Arcade Mode is called a "Destined Battle", which is a predefined battle that never changes. Each character has one according to their story, and all Destined Battles are shared by groups of two characters (for example, Mitsurugi→Taki and Taki→Mitsurugi) with the exceptions of the home console-exclusive characters. As in Soulcalibur, there is a "Museum" containing character artwork and various videos (like the Arcade Mode's intro or the Weapon Master Mode's intro and Ending) and an "Exhibition Theater" (where "katas" can be viewed). There is also a "Profile Viewer" (to read about character's stories) and a "Battle Theater" (to watch CPU vs CPU battles).

A returning feature from Soul Edge that was absent from the first Soulcalibur is the inclusion of Extra Weapons. Instead of the many stats used in Soul Edge, this one uses only three stats: attack, defense and special abilities (such as draining energy, passing through defense, etc.). Each character has 12 different weapons, from the standard (basic) weapons for 1P and 2P to the powerful "Ultimate Weapon". Also, each character is granted a Soul Edge version of their weapon, as well as a "Joke Weapon" with bad stats and effects, and with unique and funny hit sounds. Each weapon is given a backstory in the "Weapon Gallery". Like before, some characters possess a third costume, which is purchased in Weapon Master Mode. Out of the 25 selectable characters, 13 are granted a third costume: Astaroth, Cassandra, Ivy Valentine, Mitsurugi, Nightmare, Raphael, Seung Mina, Sophitia, Taki, Talim, Voldo, and Xianghua. The GameCube version's guest character Link has four costumes (green, red, blue and lavender) and Assassin, Berserker and Lizardman each have six different costumes (three color edits of their two standard costumes).

The Arcade version has a unique mode called "Conquest Mode" that allows the player to pick an army, fight enemies and gain experience points, increasing the level of the selected player. "Weapon Master Mode", made in a similar fashion to Soul Edge's "Edge Master Mode" and Soulcalibur's "Mission Mode", takes the core system from "Conquest Mode" and expands upon it. It introduces a story set in an alternate world, in which the player moves in a map divided into "regions" (named after stars) and fights enemies to gain experience points (which raise the "rank" of the character) and money (which can be used to buy weapons, art, costumes and videos). The mode has 10 normal chapters, four sub-chapters and two extra-chapters as well as Extra-Missions (alternate versions of normal missions). The player endorses the role of a swordsman searching for Soul Edge, who is confronted by a powerful, mad knight named Veral, seeking Soul Edge for his own desires.

== Characters ==
A compilation of the unique box art, depicting each console's unique characters. Spawn from the comic book series of the same name on the Xbox (left), Link from The Legend of Zelda on the GameCube (middle), and Heihachi Mishima from Tekken on the PlayStation 2 (right).

Four new playable characters are introduced in Soulcalibur II: Cassandra (fighting style derived from Sophitia), Raphael (unique fighting style), Talim (unique fighting style) and Yunsung (fighting style derived from Hwang).

A new unlockable character, Charade, switches its style to match existing characters' move lists with each individual round of fighting, similarly to its predecessors Edge Master and Inferno. The console versions of the game feature Necrid, a new character created by Todd McFarlane, and one of three platform-exclusive characters: Heihachi Mishima from Tekken on the PlayStation 2, Link from The Legend of Zelda on the GameCube, and Spawn from the comic book series of the same name by McFarlane on the Xbox. Cloud Strife from Final Fantasy VII was originally intended to fill Heihachi's spot on the PlayStation 2 version, but the licensing deal fell through at the last moment. The HD version includes both Heihachi and Spawn.

Fully returning as playable characters are Astaroth, Cervantes (unlockable), Ivy, Kilik, Maxi, Mitsurugi, Nightmare, Taki, Voldo, Xianghua and Yoshimitsu (unlockable), as well as Seung Mina (unlockable) and Sophitia (unlockable) who are exclusive to the console versions. Inferno is the game's main boss, but is no longer a playable character. Nightmare's third costume is Siegfried (although he is still referred to as Nightmare), while Assassin and Berserker play extremely similarly to Hwang and Rock, who do not return from the previous game. Although the original Lizardman from Soulcalibur does not return, the game does feature a generic Lizardman with the same move list. Since Assassin, Berserker and Lizardman are considered bonus characters, they do not have any Extra Weapons. In the North American and PAL console versions, they can only be selected in Versus Battle Mode, Team Battle Mode, Versus Team Battle Mode, Practice Mode, along with the "Extra" versions of these modes, as well as in Battle Theater. In the Japanese console versions, they cannot be selected by the player in any mode. They are, however, playable during certain portions of Weapon Master Mode in all versions of the game.

== Plot ==
The game is set in the year 1590 AD, four years after the events of Soulcalibur. The wave of slaughters that terrorized Europe reached a sudden end. The knight in azure armor, Nightmare, and his followers were successful in collecting enough souls and were about to start the restoration ceremony on the ruins of the once-proud Ostrheinsburg Castle. But just as the ceremony was about to start, three young warriors assaulted the castle. In a matter of time, the cult was defeated, and Nightmare stood in front of the young warriors while wielding Soul Edge. After an intense battle, Nightmare fell, but then the evil soul inside Soul Edge sent the young warriors into a vortex of hellfire and stood to confront them. As a result of Soul Edge's evil aura, Krita-Yuga revealed its true form: that of the Holy Sword, Soul Calibur. The intense battle ended with the victory of the holy sword, but when the vortex of Inferno collapsed, both swords along with the Azure Knight Nightmare were sucked into the void and expelled to another place. Siegfried Schtauffen, who was until a moment before the Azure Knight, reclaimed his own mind. Recognizing his sins, he set on a journey of atonement. Still, the blade held a strong bond, and every night, it took control of his body and absorbed souls of those nearby. The efforts made by the young knight were fruitless, and four years later the Azure Knight returned. Around those times, various warriors came into contact with the blade's remaining fragments, revealing Soul Edge's ultimate survival. After its defeat, the fragments began causing chaos and evil to grow in the world. Driven by the need to either possess or destroy the evil sword, each warrior embarks on a new journey, while Nightmare starts his rampage anew, seeking souls to gain the power to restore Soul Edge once again...

== Development and release ==
At E3 2001, Namco showed a trailer for the "next chapter" of Soulcalibur. In August 2001, Namco confirmed that Soulcalibur II was in development and would be simultaneously available for the PlayStation 2, GameCube, and Xbox. In that same month, the GameCube version was shown at Nintendo Space World 2001. The game had a marketing budget of $9.4 million.

A soundtrack for the game was released as Soulcalibur II Original Soundtrack. An art book was also published.

=== Soulcalibur II HD Online ===
A high-definition version of the game, titled Soulcalibur II HD Online, based on the PlayStation 2 version of the game, was released digitally for PlayStation 3 through PlayStation Network and Xbox 360 through Xbox Live in North America and Europe on November 19 and 20, 2013, respectively, and in Japan on February 20, 2014. It includes all game modes from the original releases, as well as support for online-only gameplay via PlayStation Network and Xbox Live. For reasons unknown, the English version of the HD re-release lacks the dual-language option available in the original game and only features English voice acting. Both versions of the game also include two guest characters, Heihachi Mishima and Spawn, who were previously exclusive to specific platforms (PlayStation 2 and Xbox, respectively), and the PS2 version's opening movie is used. In addition, in Japan, having the game data allowed for two virtual items and a costume to be available for free in Soulcalibur: Lost Swords.

== Reception ==
Reception

Aggregate scores
| Aggregator | Score | | | |
| Aggregator | GameCube | PS2 | Xbox | Xbox 360 |
|---|---|---|---|---|
| GameRankings | 92% | 91% | 92% | 78.75% |
| Metacritic | 93/100 | 92/100 | 92/100 | 77/100 |

Review scores
| Publication | Score | | | |
| Publication | GameCube | PS2 | Xbox | Xbox 360 |
|---|---|---|---|---|
| Edge | 9/10 | 9/10 | 9/10 | |
| Electronic Gaming Monthly | 9.66/10 | 9.66/10 | 9.66/10 | |
| Eurogamer | 10/10 | 10/10 | 10/10 | 8/10 |
| Game Informer | 8.75/10 | 8.5/10 | 8.5/10 | |
| GamePro | 5/5 | 5/5 | 5/5 | |
| GameSpot | 8.5/10 | 8.5/10 | 8.5/10 | |
| GameSpy | 5/5 | 4.5/5 | 5/5 | |
| IGN | 9.2/10 | 9.2/10 | 9.2/10 | |
| Nintendo Life | 10/10 | | | |
| Nintendo Power | 5/5 | | | |
| Official U.S. PlayStation Magazine | | 5/5 | | |
| Official Xbox Magazine (US) | | | 9.2/10 | 7.5/10 |
| Play | 9.1/10 | A− | A− | |

Awards
| Publication | Award |
|---|---|
| Academy of Interactive Arts & Sciences (2004) | Console Fighting Game of the Year |
| Spike Video Game Awards | Most Addictive Game |

The original version of Soulcalibur II received critical acclaim, earning it the average scores of 91.3% for the PlayStation 2, 92.3% for the GameCube, and 91.6% for the Xbox. Greg Kasavin of GameSpot praised the game "It's certainly one of the most refined, most accessible, and best-looking 3D fighting games to date, and it's squarely the best game in its class for the Xbox and GameCube." IGN writer Kaiser Hwang gave the game a positive review, but commented on its similarity to the first game "And so, while evolution is not always mandatory, sometimes pushing the boundaries can lead to bigger and better things. In the case of Soul Calibur II, contentment will do just fine." In a retrospective review of the game, PJ O'Reilly of Nintendo Life gave the game a perfect 10/10, writing that the game "will ruin lots of modern fighting games for you." The game was also the subject of a collusion scandal at EVO 2004 that turned the game and franchise into an unwelcome black sheep in the fighting game community, and it was not welcome back in future installments until 2010.

In the first ever Spike Video Game Awards in 2003, Soulcalibur II won in the category Most Addictive Game. During the 7th Annual Interactive Achievement Awards, the game was awarded Console Fighting Game of the Year by the Academy of Interactive Arts & Sciences; it also received a nomination for Outstanding Achievement in Animation. In 2009, Official Nintendo Magazine praised the inclusion of Link, placing the game 41st on a list of greatest Nintendo games. In 2011, Complex ranked it as the 14th best fighting game of all time.

=== Sales ===
By July 2006, the GameCube version of Soulcalibur II had sold 850,000 copies and earned $32 million in the United States. Next Generation ranked it as the 69th highest-selling game launched for the PlayStation 2, Xbox or GameCube between January 2000 and July 2006 in that country. Combined sales of Soulcalibur games reached 2.6 million units in the United States by July 2006. As of 2007, the GameCube version sold about a million copies in the US, and 100,000 in Japan, making it one of the best-selling third-party GameCube games. The PlayStation 2 version received a "Gold" sales award from the Entertainment and Leisure Software Publishers Association (ELSPA), indicating sales of at least 200,000 copies in the United Kingdom.
