= Jillian Aversa =

American vocalist and composer

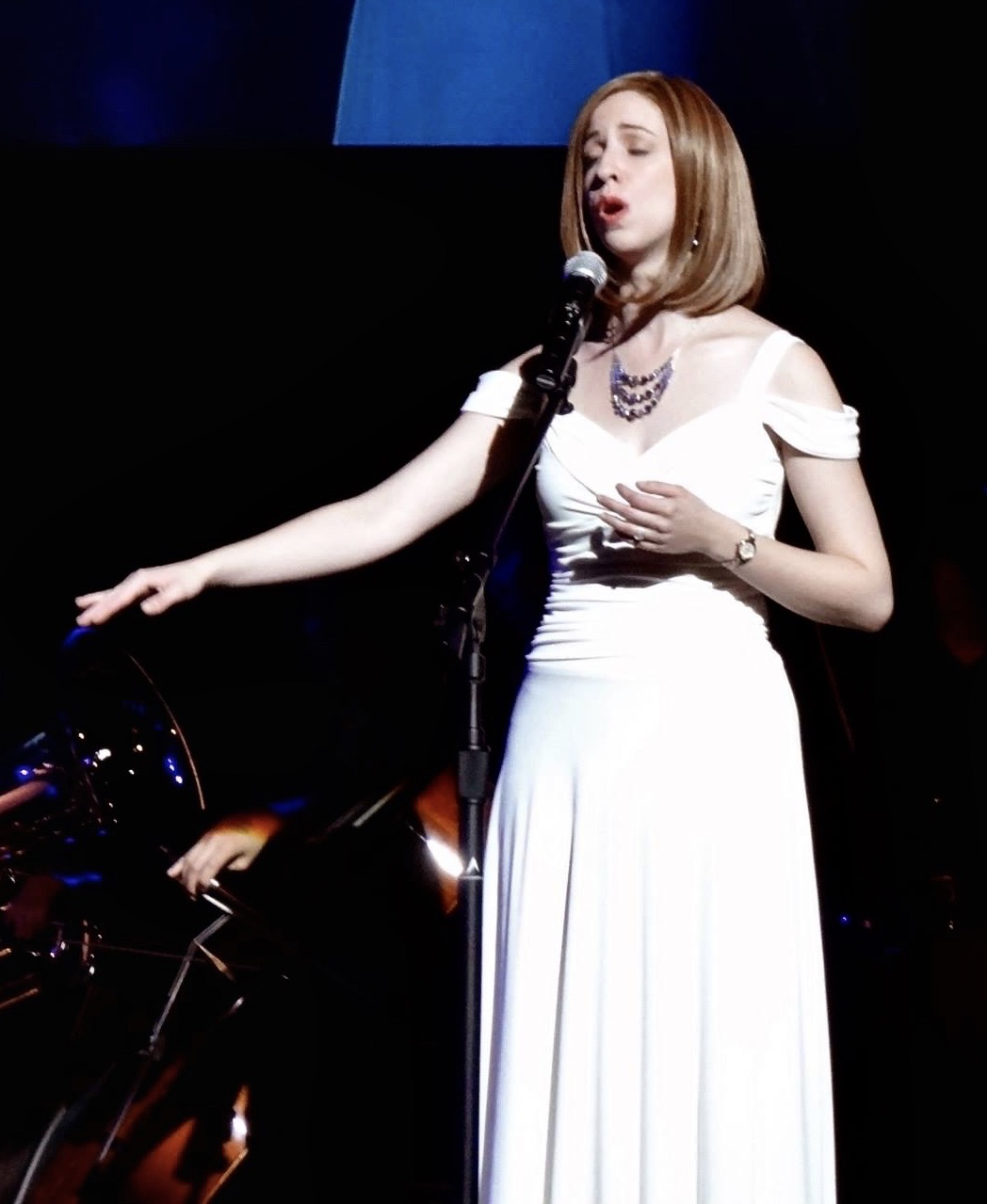
- Aversa performing with Video Games Live in 2013

Background information
- Born: Jillian Goldin
- Genres: Video Game Music, New Age Music, World Music
- Occupations: Vocalist; composer
- Instrument: Vocals
- Years active: 2007–present
- Website: www.jillianaversa.com

YouTube information
- Channel: JillianAversa
- Years active: 2010–present
- Genre: Music

Jillian Aversa (née Goldin) is an American vocalist and composer best known for her contributions to video game soundtracks, YouTube music videos, and as a soloist with the international concert tour Video Games Live. In addition to her performances of video game music, she is a composer of contemporary New Age/World music and has released several solo albums. Her music video performances have received news coverage in Polygon, Wired, Nerdist, and Game Informer.

== Video game soundtracks ==
- Halo: Combat Evolved Anniversary (2011): vocalist
- Halo 2 Anniversary (2014): vocalist
- Halo: Spartan Assault (2013): vocalist
- Halo: Spartan Strike (2015): vocalist
- God of War: Ghost of Sparta (2010): vocalist
- Soulcalibur V (2012): vocalist, composer
- Civilization V: Gods and Kings (2012): vocalist
- Civilization IV: Beyond the Sword (2007): vocalist
- Killer Instinct (2013): vocalist
- Katamari Damacy: Tap My Katamari (2016): vocalist
- Crimson Dragon (2013): vocalist
- Shadowgate (2014): vocalist
- Where the Water Tastes Like Wine (2018): vocalist
- Pump It Up Pro 2 (2010): vocalist

== Discography ==
- Atlantis Awakening – composer, vocalist, lyricist
- Through Sand and Snow – composer, vocalist, lyricist
- Origins – composer, vocalist, lyricist
- Calling All Dawns – with Christopher Tin – vocalist
- Video Games Live: Level 4 – Video Games Live – vocalist, arranger
- Video Games Live: Level 3 – Video Games Live – vocalist
- Identity Sequence – with zircon – composer, vocalist, lyricist
- Antigravity – with zircon – composer, vocalist, lyricist
- Touhou Zerokyo Kitan ~ Sophisticated Insanity – with Hiroki Kikuta – vocalist, lyricist
- Just Fun – with Alexander Brandon – vocalist
- Beyond Libra – with Wilbert Roget II – vocalist
- The Answer: Armored Core Tribute Album – with Mattias Häggström Gerdt – vocalist
- The Lullaby Album – with Jennifer Thomas, Carolyn Southworth – vocalist
- Awakening – with Marc Enfroy – vocalist
- Synergy – Various Artists – composer, vocalist, lyricist

== Video Games Live concert tour ==
Aversa joined the Video Games Live concert tour as a solo vocalist in 2013. She also appeared as a soloist and arranger on the tour's Level 3 and Level 4 studio albums.

== Personal life ==
Aversa is married to composer and software developer Andrew "zircon" Aversa. They reside in Maryland, and had a daughter in 2018 and a son in 2021.
