= Zircon (composer) =

American video game composer (born 1987)

zircon (Andrew Aversa)
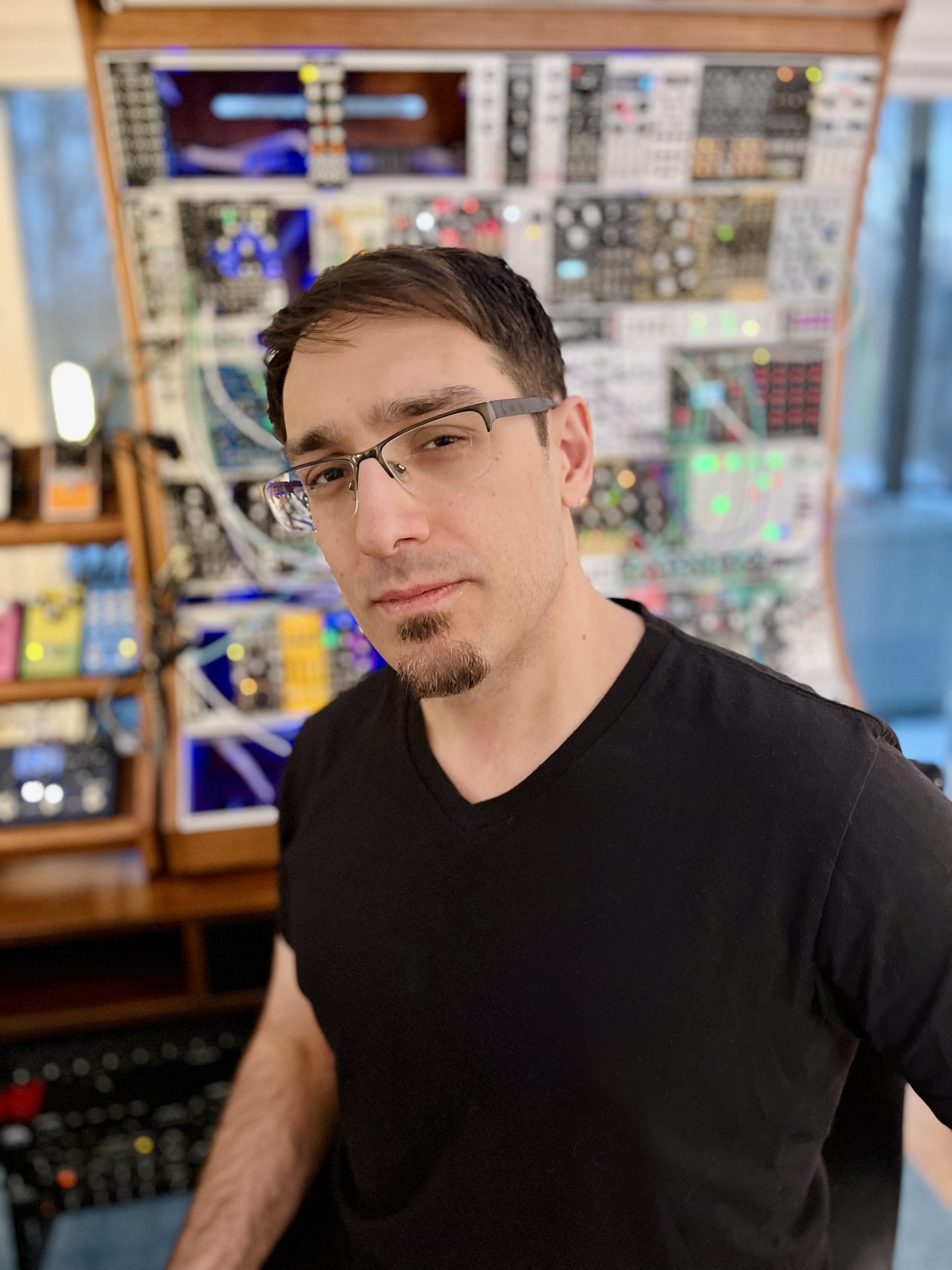
- Aversa in 2025

Background information
- Born: Andrew Aversa; June 23, 1987 (age 39)
- Genres: Electronica; trance; drum and bass; breakbeat; electro house; ambient; video game music
- Occupations: Musician; composer; producer; software developer; game designer
- Instruments: Computer; piano
- Years active: 2003–present
- Labels: Zircon Studios, Materia Collective
- Spouse: Jillian Aversa (2009-present)
- Website: zirconmusic.com

Andrew Aversa (born June 23, 1987), known professionally as zircon, is an American electronic musician, sample library developer, and composer primarily known for his work on video game soundtracks, including Super Street Fighter II Turbo HD Remix, Monkey Island 2: LeChuck's Revenge Special Edition, Soulcalibur V, Pump It Up, and Newgrounds. He is an adjunct professor at Drexel University and co-founder and CEO of Impact Soundworks, a virtual instrument company.

== Career ==
Aversa began arranging video game music, which he uploaded to OverClocked ReMix, in the early 2000s.

== Personal life ==
Aversa lives in Maryland with his wife, Jillian Aversa, who is a vocalist, songwriter, and performer on video game soundtracks. He is also an adjunct professor at Drexel University as well as a Drexel graduate. He has made multiple appearances at conventions and festivals, such as MAGFest and Otakon.

== Releases ==
Albums

- Phasma Elementum (2004)
- Impulse Prime (2005)
- Antigravity (2007)
- The World Circuit (2007)
- Mass Media Constant (2009)
- Fittest – Original Soundtrack (2009)
- Vastlands (2009)
- Return All Robots! Original Soundtrack (2010)
- Unearthed (2012)
- Globulous Original Soundtrack (2012)
- Identity Sequence (2012)
- Getaway (EP, 2014)
- Demon Truck Original Soundtrack (2016)
- Tangledeep Original Soundtrack (2018)
- The Classic Video Game ReMixes Volume 1 (2024)
- Arcology (2025)

Singles

- "Augment" (2013)
- "Across the Ocean" (2013)
- "Neptune" (2015)
- "Ice Lock" (2015)
- "Beyond Vision" (2016)
- "Take the Metro" (2018)
- "Spire" (2021)
- "No Limits feat. Jillian Aversa" (2021)
