= Chris Brandt =

American cartoonist and filmmaker (born 1970)

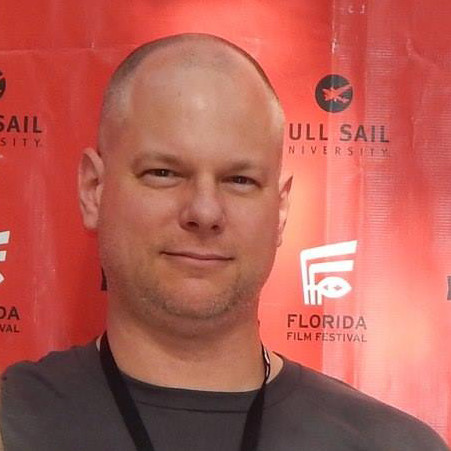
- Brandt at the 2014 Florida Film Festival
- Born: Frederick Christe Brandt; February 4, 1970 (age 56) Silver Spring, Maryland, U.S.
- Areas: Cartoonist, Writer, Penciller, Inker
- Pseudonym: F.C. Brandt
- Notable works: Dance, Voldo, Dance
- Awards: Longbaugh Film Festival Best Short Film - 2006; Northampton Independent Film Festival Best Narrative Short - 2005

Chris Brandt (born February 4, 1970) is an American filmmaker and cartoonist, director of the documentary Independents, featuring James C. Kaufman.

== Biography ==
Brandt was born in Silver Spring, Maryland, the son of a U.S. diplomat, and spent his youth in several countries. He studied at the University of Maryland and UC Santa Cruz. In 1993, after graduating college, he pursued cartooning on his own, eventually becoming associated with the comic book co-op Puppy Toss in Berkeley, California, and creating the Artfly mini-comics series with fellow cartoonist Jesse Reklaw.

He turned his attentions to film making and video in 2000, creating the celebrated Dance, Voldo, Dance in 2003, the award-winning short film Closing Time in 2005, and the critically acclaimed feature documentary Independents in 2007.

He chauffeured for Karen Black at the 2008 Sundance Film Festival.

His feature documentary about Jim Woodring, The Illumination of Jim Woodring, premiered on Comic Book Resources online in 2020.

== Awards ==
Brandt's short film, Closing Time, won "Best Narrative Short" at the 2005 Northampton Independent Film Festival, and "Best Short Film" at the 2006 Longbaugh Film Festival. The short film placed 2nd for "Best Short" in the 2006 East Lansing Film Festival.

Brandt's Dance, Voldo, Dance was nominated for "Best Virtual Performance" at the 2005 Machinima Film Festival.

Accepted the 2003 Eisner Award for Jason Shiga.

== Works ==
Films

- The Illumination of Jim Woodring (2020)
- Ambien & Aaron (2013)
- Independents: A Guide for the Creative Spirit (2007)
- Closing Time (2005)

Comic book series

- Bainst #1-6, 1996–2004, self-published minicomics
- Far Flung, 1999, comic book calendar
- Artfly #1-3, self-published minicomics

Television

- Comic Book Geeks (2007–2013)

Machinima

- Dance, Voldo, Dance (2003)
