= Soulcalibur III =

2005 video game

- NTSC box art for the game, depicting characters Mitsurugi and Ivy in the background, Zasalamel in the front, and Nightmare in the logo
- Developer: Project Soul
- Publishers: JP: Namco; NA: Namco Hometek; EU: Sony Computer Entertainment
- Directors: Jin Okubo; Shinobu Nimura; Taisuke Aihara
- Producers: Hiroaki Yotoriyama; Akiko Tange; Mitsuo Kashiwagi
- Designers: Tetsuya Akatsuka; Makoto Kiyokawa; Ryouji Ichikari
- Programmers: Yoshihito Iwanaga; Takashi Koshigoe; Tadashi Obama
- Artists: Masashi Kubo; Takuji Kawano; Hideaki Ito
- Writer: Yoshihiro Nakagawa
- Composers: Junichi Nakatsuru; Keiki Kobayashi; Ryuichi Takada
- Series: Soulcalibur
- Platforms: PlayStation 2, Arcade
- Release: PlayStation 2: NA: October 25, 2005; EU: November 18, 2005; JP: November 23, 2005; Arcade: 2006
- Genre: Fighting
- Modes: Single-player, multiplayer
- Arcade system: Namco System 246

Soulcalibur III (ソウルキャリバーIII, Sōrukyaribā Surī) is a 2005 fighting game developed and published by Namco as a sequel to Soulcalibur II (2002) and the fourth installment in the Soulcalibur series. It was originally released for the PlayStation 2 and was followed by an improved arcade version, subtitled Arcade Edition, in 2006. It was the last Soulcalibur game to receive an arcade version and was also the last to be released by Namco as an independent company. Soulcalibur III received a mainly positive reception, and it was followed by a sequel under Namco Bandai Games, Soulcalibur IV (2008).

== Gameplay ==
Gameplay screenshot of Soulcalibur III, showing Taki attempting to throw Tira out of the ring through a destructible barrier

The game includes new modes such as Tales of Souls, an interactive story-driven mode comparable to Edge Master Mode from Soul Edge; Character Creation, in which players can create custom characters from 13 total occupations, with multiple weapons and fighting styles; and Chronicles of the Sword, a real-time-play mode that allows players to take their created souls through adventures of their own. The game also has the largest character roster — 24 characters playable in Tales of Souls mode and an additional 18 playable in all other modes — and largest battle stage selection in Soul series history.

The Character Creation Mode allows the player to choose from several classes, clothing and armor, and physical features. Most of the classes can use up to five disciplines, three of which are unique, and two of which are "Soul of ..." disciplines: an exact replica of a main story character's moves. The created fighter's personality can be altered, which influences their quotes and their actions during battle. However, the personality is chosen by the equipment the character wears, and not directly by the player.

The Soul Arena is a mode that allows both the eight-match Quick Play (the standard Arcade Mode of the game), which is light on story and allows a speedy confrontation with Abyss, as well as the pre-defined Missions which include variations on the standard matches. There is a World Competition mode created to simulate tournament rounds (of either eliminations or Round Robin) against the CPU.

The Tales of Souls mode is presented as a book, narrating the selected character's story in detail during various chapters. The player can input button combos when an icon appears in the top right-hand corner during cut scene movies. The cut scenes can have different outcomes depending on whether the player successfully inputs the sequence. During movies that precede a battle after the cut scene ends, not inputting the code could result in the player starting the subsequent battle with a disadvantageous effect.

Although the Mortal Kombat, Dead or Alive, and Street Fighter series all supported online play, Soulcalibur III does not. The game's producer Hiroaki Yotoriyama said "At the current time, the online infrastructure is extremely different between countries, and there are people that can not enjoy network gaming. We've decided to concentrate on improving the game's offline content and its characters so that people all over the world will be able to have fun."

=== Chronicles of the Sword ===
Chronicles of the Sword is a single player mode gametype that combines Real Time Strategy (RTS) gameplay with the standard Soul Calibur fights. It begins with the player starting out as a new commander for the Grandall Empire. There are 20 chronicles, which are essentially a map of objectives to defeat. After the objectives are satisfied, the player moves on to the next map, which get more difficult as the player progresses.

In this mode, the player and computer send out their "troops", and a commander. The player must fight their enemies and take their strongholds scattered through the level. The player may allow his troops/commander to fight on the RTS board, or choose to do a traditional Soul Calibur battle with various characters for each side. The player can lose property if they lose on the RTS board; a risk not present when fighting in the traditional Soul Calibur style.

Chronicles of the Sword and the other modes are tied together, as well. Disciplines, costumes/armor, weapons, characters, and various aesthetics and skills carry over from one mode to another, and each rely on the other to unlock items. You cannot, for example, use certain skills or weapons without unlocking the proper discipline(s), and this could be based on playing different modes. All rewards are valid in all modes.

== Characters ==
The main three new warriors in the game are Zasalamel, Tira and Setsuka, all with totally different fighting styles than other series fighters. Nearly all of the warriors previously featured in Soul series titles return, with the exception of Inferno, Necrid, Seong Han-myeong, Edge Master and the console-exclusive Soulcalibur II special guests (Heihachi, Link, and Spawn). Soulcalibur II's mimic character Charade does return in a non-playable form, as do the generic Lizardmen.

Unlockable characters include personnel in the Chronicles of the Sword, opponents from the Tales of Souls mode, and the weapon, armor, and item shop owners. In the Character Creation mode, players can re-create KOS-MOS from the Xenosaga series as well as Taira No Kagekiyo from Genpei Tōma Den, Gilgamesh from The Tower of Druaga, and Valkyrie from Valkyrie no Densetsu.

== Plot ==
This game takes place shortly after the events of Soulcalibur II, in 1590. The amount of time is not specified, but taking into account the various characters' profiles, a minimum of four months has already passed (one month needed to carry Kilik and Xianghua back to his master's hermit, three months that took Kilik to surpass his master's training).

The wicked Soul Edge survived its fated encounter with the wielder of Soulcalibur, Xianghua, and restored its control over the body of Siegfried Schtauffen, turning him back into the Azure Knight Nightmare. Four years later, Nightmare was about to restore Soul Edge, when suddenly a man named Raphael appeared, intending on taking Soul Edge. Nightmare defeated the attacker, but was distracted by Siegfried's latent will trying to restore his body. Using the distraction, Raphael pierced Soul Edge's eye, giving Siegfried the edge he needed to break free from Soul Edge's control once again.

After waking up, Siegfried found the holy sword, free from its entrapment within the wicked sword, and out of instinct used it to pierce Soul Edge. The result led to both swords sealed together in a fateful embrace, an "Embrace of Souls". Siegfried took both weapons and started a quest to find a definitive way of sealing Soul Edge, but memories of his slaughters, plus the attacks of those resentful of the Azure Knight, drove his mind towards insanity. Unbeknownst to him, the evil soul of the blade escaped and obtained a temporary shell, starting a new killing spree to strengthen himself while seeking its body, Soul Edge.

What neither of the two warriors knows is that a man behind the scenes is controlling their steps, searching to end an everlasting curse. And that many other warriors ventured in search of the blade as well.

== Release ==
The console version of the game was first released in North America on October 25, 2005. A soundtrack for the game was released as Soulcalibur III Original Soundtrack - Legend of Sounds. Two guide books were released in Japan in November–December 2005: Famitsu's Soul Calibur III Starting Guide Book and Namco's own Soul Calibur III Official Complete Guide.

=== Soulcalibur III: Arcade Edition ===
Soulcalibur III: Arcade Edition is a re-tuned and glitch-fixed version of Soulcalibur III that was first released in the arcades on April 3, 2006. Almost the entire cast from the home version returns as playable characters except Abyss, who is now a non-playable boss character alongside Night Terror. From the 17 bonus characters only three made it into the arcade: Hwang Seong-gyeong, Li Long and Amy Sorel, who have been reworked and expanded into more deep playing styles. The total roster of the arcade ascends to 27 selectable characters.

The game has three different modes: Training Mode, where one can try the characters' moves for a set time; Standard Mode, which is a traditional arcade mode with nine battles in a row, without cut scenes or endings; and Legends Mode, a complex eight-round mode based upon the creation of and competition between customized characters with accumulated skills taken from the home version's Chronicles of the Sword mode, such as increased stamina or the ability to automatically escape grapples.

The Standard mode brings back Inferno as a sub boss character (Stage 8). The only difference is Inferno will now only use a move set similar to Cervantes instead of randomly doing the moves of any character.

=== Technical issues ===
If the player moves, deletes or does anything to any piece of data on a memory card that was created before a Chronicles of the Sword save file, the save file will become corrupt and unreadable, and sometimes has the potential of also corrupting all of Soulcalibur III's save data. This could also leave a block of corrupted data on the memory card that can't be deleted. This will force players to start the game all over again. The only way to prevent this is to have a Soulcalibur III save file as the first saved on the player's memory card.

== Reception ==
Reception

Aggregate score
Aggregator	Score
Metacritic	86/100

Review scores
Publication	Score
1Up.com	A
Edge	8/10
Electronic Gaming Monthly	9/10
Eurogamer	8/10
GamePro	4/5
GameSpot	8.2/10
IGN	8.5/10

Award
Publication	Award
Academy of Interactive Arts & Sciences (2006)	Fighting Game of the Year

The game has generally positive reviews with an aggregate score of 86/100 on Metacritic. IGN lauded it for its "stunning environment" and "charming characters" but thought that the game could use more diverse sound effects. GameSpot praised the "fun, fast-paced gameplay" but criticized the lack of online play.

=== Awards ===
- E3 2005 Game Critics Awards: Best Fighting Game
- E3 2005 GameSpot Awards: Best Fighting Game
- IGN: Best Fighting Game of 2005
- AIAS 9th Annual Interactive Achievement Awards: Fighting Game of the Year

In 2011, Complex ranked it as the 34th best fighting game of all time.

== Collectible card game ==
Soulcalibur III is part of the Universal Fighting System collectible card game, created by Sabertooth Games and later published by Fantasy Flight Games. It was one of the official founding franchises of the card game, next to Street Fighter, when the game was released April 2006. UFS has seen five expansions based on Soulcalibur III's characters and history.
