= Soulcalibur (video game) =

1998 video game

- European arcade flyer
- Developer: Project Soul
- Publishers: Namco: Dreamcast; JP/PAL: Namco; NA: Namco Hometek Xbox 360, iOS, Android Bandai Namco Games
- Directors: Jin Okubo; Yoshitaka Tezuka
- Producers: Yasuhiro Noguchi; Hiroaki Yotoriyama
- Designers: Tetsuya Akatsuka; Tsuyoshi Kiuchi
- Programmer: Shinobu Nimura
- Artist: Ryoichi Ban
- Writer: Yoshihiro Nakagawa
- Composers: Junichi Nakatsuru; Yoshihito Yano; Akitaka Tohyama; Takanori Otsuka
- Series: Soulcalibur
- Platforms: Arcade; Dreamcast; Xbox 360; iOS; Android
- Release: July 30, 1998: Arcade; JP: July 30, 1998; NA/EU: 1998; Dreamcast; JP: August 5, 1999; NA: September 9, 1999; EU: November 26, 1999 Xbox 360; WW: July 2, 2008 iOS; WW: January 19, 2012 Android; WW: November 20, 2013
- Genre: Fighting
- Modes: Single-player, multiplayer
- Arcade system: Namco System 12

Soulcalibur (Note: Japanese: ソウルキャリバー, Hepburn: Sōrukyaribā) is a 1998 fighting game developed and published by Namco. It is the second game in the Soulcalibur series, preceded by Soul Edge. Originally released in arcades on July 30, 1998, it ran on the Namco System 12 PlayStation-based hardware, and was ported to the Dreamcast in 1999 with new features and improved graphics.

The game centers on the pursuit of the legendary weapon known as Soul Edge, now in the possession of a warrior known as Nightmare, who slaughters countless people to satisfy the blade's bloodlust. Other warriors pursue him either to claim the weapon for themselves or to destroy it, end his mass murder, and free him of its curse. Developed closely with Namco's Tekken development team, it is one of the few home console ports that outdid their arcade parent performance-wise. The title brought many innovations to the fighting game genre that include a heavy emphasis on weapons and a unique eight-way movement system.

Soulcalibur received unanimous critical applause upon release; it is one of the highest-rated video games on Metacritic, where it holds a 98 rating. It won the majority of Game of the Year awards in its respective year, and is widely regarded as one of the greatest fighting games and one of the greatest video games ever made, topping numerous "best of" lists in years following. The North American home version was released as a launch game for the Dreamcast, playing a part in its successful launch. Soulcalibur became available as a downloadable title on the Xbox 360's Xbox Live Marketplace in July 2008, and is forward compatible with the Xbox One. Its sequel Soulcalibur II was released in 2002 to comparative acclaim.

== Gameplay ==
Nightmare fighting against Sophitia in the Dreamcast version

One of the biggest innovations introduced by Soulcalibur to the gameplay system of its predecessor, Soul Edge, is the eight-way run. Previous 3D fighters had only limited movement along the third axis, with sidesteps and rolls providing useful but unsustained lateral movement. In Soulcalibur, simply holding down a joystick direction causes the character to move in that direction, giving the player a sense of freedom and deepening the strategy of the game.

Soulcalibur also features "forgiving buffering", allowing players to enter an input for one move before their characters have finished recovering from their previous move, which makes executing a quick succession of moves easier (other fighting games such as the Tekken and Virtua Fighter series have relatively strict buffering requirements, meaning expert timing is required to pull off many combinations, but Soulcalibur features much more lenient timing to successfully execute a buffer). Finally, the Guard Impact offensive blocking maneuver shown in Soul Edge has been given a deeper range of techniques, allowing players to push back or redirect attacks past themselves as well as swatting away an opponent's weapon to stun them.

== Characters ==
Soulcalibur was originally planned to be a dramatic overhaul, with all newcomers apart from Mitsurugi from Soul Edge. However, nine of the 11 warriors from Soul Edge ended up being carried over to Soulcalibur by the time the roster was finalized in the Dreamcast version (Cervantes, Hwang, Seong Mi-na, Mitsurugi, Rock, Siegfried, Sophitia, Taki, Voldo), with an additional ten new warriors joining the ranks. Cervantes exclusively appears outside original arcade version, in additions to a playable version of the final boss character, Inferno. The arcade version featured a staggered Time Release system for hidden characters akin to the Tekken series as well as codes that could be entered on the Namco website.

As with many fighting games, many of the new characters were heavily styled after existing characters from the franchise. For example, new character Maxi has a fighting style and move set influenced by Soul Edge's Li Long (the only of the original starting characters not to return). In fact, Soulcalibur only added one original playing style, belonging to Ivy. New characters Xianghua, Maxi, Yoshimitsu, Astaroth, Kilik, Nightmare (re-introduced from Soul Edge as a regular character), and Lizardman were based upon existing characters Hwang, Li Long, Mitsurugi, Rock, Seong Mi-na, Siegfried, and Sophitia, respectively. Consequently, Namco has been working since Soulcalibur to gradually separate the individual styles of the characters in order to make each one unique.

== Plot ==
The mystical sword of the legends, the "Soul Edge", ended up in the hands of the dreaded pirate Cervantes de Leon of Spain. For the next 25 years he stayed dormant on the remnants of a Spanish port town taking the souls of those who reached him during their search for the sword. Like Soul Edge this game begins in the year 1583. The reign of terror of Cervantes was soon to start but through the joined efforts of Greek divine warrior Sophitia Alexandra and Japanese ninja Taki he was stopped and killed with one of the twin Soul Edge blades shattered in the process. As it was about to tear itself apart a young German knight Siegfried Schtauffen approached the port town and battled Cervantes whose corpse had been momentarily reanimated through the will of the Soul Edge. After emerging victorious Siegfried's attention turned to the sword. At the moment he took the hilt of the cursed blade Soul Edge released a bright column of light into the sky. This was known as the "Evil Seed" which was bound to bring calamity and death in its wake.

Three years after those events, Soul Edge uses Siegfried as its host, and now Siegfried is Nightmare, a knight wearing azure armor and sporting a hideously deformed right arm. Europe plunges into a vortex of slaughters as he and his followers claim souls to strengthen the blade in its weakened state. Unknown to them a group of warriors met on their journey to stop Soul Edge and with them three sacred weapons join once again.

== Development ==
After releasing Soul Edge, Namco took some time to evaluate what had made the game successful before jumping into the development of its sequel. Producer Hiroaki Yotoriyama decided to give the sequel a new name instead of just calling it Soul Edge 2 in order to have a fresh start and take the series in a new direction. The name Soulcalibur is a portmanteau of the word soul (as in Soul Edge) and King Arthur's sword Excalibur (ultimately, the name would be used within the game's universe for the holy weapon which would counteract Soul Edge's evil). Inspired by an internal Namco prototype featuring a character able to run openly in a field, the eight-way run system was implemented. Upon application, the development team was surprised at how well it meshed with their fighting system and decided to build the rest of the game around it. During development they worked closely with Namco's Tekken development team, sharing ideas and research. Yotoriyama felt that with that cooperation and partnership, they were able to develop "the greatest weapon-based fighting action game in the world".

Yotoriyama has described the game's concept as expressing "fun and diversity in weapon combat", citing the contrast in how one weapon would affect gameplay compared to another and how they would react to each other upon clashing. Each character's fighting style was designed to revolve around their weapon, though he noted that because of the differences they experienced difficulty in balancing the gameplay. He described the availability of movement in comparison to Tekken 3 as a large contrast between the two series and more tactical and emphasized how it interacted with the game's "ring out" feature. Each character in Soulcalibur was designed around the idea that they could be viewed as a real person could, and to this end, motion creator Masataka Ishiguro emphasized the arm and leg movements for each character in relation to their weapon, wanting players to "feel the individual motions and the realism within the game"

It had been announced in January as "New Weapon Fighting Game" and a test version was shown at E3 in May. The team for the arcade version of Soulcalibur consisted of roughly sixty people working on Namco's System 12 hardware, while the team developing the home port was reduced to about forty. Given a deadline of seven months to coincide with the North American launch of the Dreamcast, the transition was difficult for the team, due to the differences in hardware. Namco formally announced the Dreamcast version of Soulcalibur on March 11, 1999, as its first title for the console. The development team had received Dreamcast development hardware in late October 1998 and initially spent approximately six weeks adapting the arcade game's programming before beginning more extensive conversion work in December.

However, due to the similar capabilities and limits of each system, content was left intact between the two versions, with Yotoriyama feeling that the team was "obsessed" with giving their best effort for the port. The biggest technological change to the Dreamcast port was to render all of the game's stages in full 3D polygons, whereas the far backgrounds in the arcade original were flat, two-dimensional images. In an interview following the completion of the Dreamcast conversion, members of Namco's development team highlighted the atmosphere of the redesigned stages, improvements to character expressions, and the expanded Mission Battle mode as notable aspects of the home release. For the Dreamcast conversion, Namco further refined the characters' facial models and animations, adjusting facial proportions and modelling details such as the interior of the mouth and jaw to improve their expressions. The development team also improved the precision of the game's motion-capture data and introduced real-time lighting effects to enhance character shadows and the appearance of skin under torchlight. Additional content was also added to the game to ensure replay value, based on researching other fighting games marketed at the time. Many of the team's ideas that they were unable to incorporate into the port were eventually used for later games in the series.

== Release ==
The game was originally released in the Japanese arcades on July 30, 1998, with releases in North America and Europe following later the same year. A Gamest Book series guide book Soul Calibur Skill Up Manual (ソウルキャリバー スキルアップマニュアル) was published by Shinseisha on September 27, 1998.

=== Dreamcast ===
The Dreamcast port of Soulcalibur was released in Japan on August 5, 1999; in North America as a launch title on September 9, 1999; and in Europe on November 26, 1999. In Japan, the Dreamcast release was promoted through a television advertising campaign broadcast in the Tokyo metropolitan area, Osaka and Nagoya from 31 July to 8 August 1999. Namco also promoted the game through its official VS Development Team website, which held a Soulcalibur cosplay contest featuring fan recreations of the game's characters. Several submissions were showcased in the August 1999 issue of Dreamcast Magazine. The North American Dreamcast version of the game removes one of Voldo's suggestive codpieces featuring a bull. However, the codpiece is present in the European and Japanese versions, as well as the North American Xbox 360 version. The European Dreamcast version was distributed and advertised by Sega Europe.

The Dreamcast conversion received substantial graphical enhancements over the arcade original, including higher-resolution textures, additional three-dimensional stage details and improved visual effects. The home release also introduced additional modes, including Team Battle, Survival, Training and Mission Battle. In Mission Battle, players complete challenges to earn points that can be exchanged for artwork and computer-generated images, unlocking additional costumes, stages and other features. The Museum mode includes a gallery of artwork and character illustrations.

During development, Namco invited fans to submit illustrations for inclusion in the Dreamcast version, with selected artwork and contributors' names to be displayed in the game. Additional unlockable features include a Metal Mode that gives characters a metallic appearance, and a Battle Theater mode in which players can watch computer-controlled fights. The Museum mode also features an Exhibition Theater, displaying characters performing martial arts demonstrations, with additional characters unlocked through Mission Battle. Another unlockable feature, Opening Direction, allows players to customise the game's introductory cinematic by changing the characters appearing in its real-time polygonal sequences.

The Dreamcast version also included an Internet mode providing access to online content through the console's Dream Passport browser. Namco subsequently offered downloadable data for unlocking Inferno and additional wallpaper. To commemorate the game surpassing one million sales worldwide, the company also distributed downloadable Visual Memory Unit minigames, including a text adventure starring Xianghua and a collection of three minigames.

In France, a Soulcalibur tournament was held for the Dreamcast on 2 April 2000 at Studio Charcot in Champigny-sur-Marne, near Paris. Organised by four business students, the competition was planned for 128 participants divided into 32 groups of four, with prizes including a Dreamcast console, driving lessons and a mobile phone. A subsequent report in Le Parisien confirmed that the tournament took place, with competitors travelling from Paris and the surrounding region.

=== Xbox 360 ===
In 2008, Namco Bandai Games announced a port of Soulcalibur for the Xbox 360. The port was based on the European Dreamcast version and was made available for download on Xbox Live Arcade on July 2, 2008. The Xbox Live Arcade version featured high-definition graphics, online leaderboards and achievements, but did not support online multiplayer. Most of the Dreamcast version's additional modes were retained, including Museum, Team Battle and Survival, although Mission Battle was removed. Characters, artwork and other previously unlockable content were available from the beginning.

The game was delisted from the Microsoft Store in February 2022.

=== iOS and Android ===
On January 19, 2012, Namco Bandai released a port of Soulcalibur for Apple's iOS platform. Game modes in this version include Arcade, Time Attack, Survival, Extra Survival, Practice, and Museum mode. The game was released as a Universal App to run at native resolutions on iPad, iPhone, and iPod touch. The game has since been delisted from the Apple Store.

In November 2013, Namco Bandai Games released an Android version of Soulcalibur through Google Play. The port featured 19 playable characters and six game modes, including Arcade Battle, Time Attack, Survival, Extra Survival, Museum and Practice. Unlike the iOS version, the Android release did not support multiplayer.

== Reception ==
Reception

Aggregate scores
Aggregator	Score			
Aggregator	Arcade	Dreamcast	iOS	Xbox 360
GameRankings		96%		79%
Metacritic		98/100	73/100	79/100

Review scores
Publication	Score			
Publication	Arcade	Dreamcast	iOS	Xbox 360
1Up.com				B−
AllGame	4.5/5	5/5		
Eurogamer				8/10
Famitsu		40/40		
Game Informer		9.25/10		
GameFan		98%		
GamePro		5/5		
GameSpot		10/10		7.5/10
Hyper	9/10			
IGN		10/10		8.1/10
Next Generation		5/5		
TouchArcade			4/5	

Awards
Publication	Award
Electronic Gaming Monthly	Game of the Year
GameRankings	Game of the Year
GameSpot	Game of the Year
Hyper	Best Game of '99
Edge	Game of the Year (runner-up), Graphical Achievement (runner-up)

In Japan, Game Machine listed Soulcalibur as the third most successful arcade game of August 1998.

The Dreamcast version of Soulcalibur sold in excess of one million copies by December 1999, and 1.3 million by 2002. It is the second biggest selling game on the system. In Europe, Sega credited Soulcalibur as one of the best-selling games supporting the Dreamcast's early commercial performance, after the console surpassed 500,000 sales in the region within two months of its launch. French publication Gamekult retrospectively described Soulcalibur as the "system-seller" the Dreamcast had needed, noting that contemporary reviews frequently presented the game as a reason to purchase the console. French magazine Joypad similarly stated that the game strongly justified purchasing a Dreamcast. In Germany, the Dreamcast version topped Media Control's Dreamcast sales chart in February 2000. In Spain, it was the second best-selling Dreamcast game through December 1, 1999, and subsequently topped a monthly sales chart based on data from retailer Centro Mail. Hobby Consolas later credited the game with helping boost Dreamcast sales in the country.

The game won the 1999 E3 Game Critics Award for "Best Fighting Game". At the 3rd Annual Interactive Achievement Awards, the Academy of Interactive Arts & Sciences awarded Soulcalibur with "Console Game of the Year" and "Console Fighting Game of the Year" (along with a nomination for "Game of the Year").

Blake Fischer reviewed the Dreamcast version of the game for Next Generation, rating it five stars out of five, and stated that "Beautiful, deep, and far more compelling than any 3D fighter in recent memory, Soul Calibur is reason enough to own a Dreamcast."

The game received universal critical acclaim, garnering perfect 10/10 scores from GameSpot and IGN, and was for nearly a decade the last game to receive a perfect rating from IGN, until the release of Grand Theft Auto IV in 2008. It is the second game ever to get a perfect 40/40 from Japanese gaming magazine Famitsu (the first being The Legend of Zelda: Ocarina of Time). As of 2017, game review aggregator website GameRankings has the Dreamcast version ranked as the seventh best-reviewed game of all time, as well as being the highest-scoring title in the fighting game genre.

Contemporary reviews from continental European publications were similarly enthusiastic. French magazine Consoles + awarded it 98%, praising its graphics and animation while identifying minor shortcomings in the stages and weapon system. Germany's NeXt Level gave it 95%, while Italy's Game Republic praised the game as more than a straightforward arcade conversion, highlighting its visual effects, character animations and improved resolution. Spain's Revista Oficial Dreamcast awarded it 10/10 and ranked it first in a comparison of Dreamcast fighting games, ahead of Power Stone, Virtua Fighter 3tb and Marvel vs. Capcom.

The Dreamcast version of Soulcalibur also holds a score of 98, making it one of the highest-rated video games of all time across all consoles and platforms, on Metacritic. (Note: Soulcalibur shares its status as the second-highest-rated game on Metacritic with Tony Hawk's Pro Skater 2 (2000) and Grand Theft Auto IV (2008).)

=== Retrospective ===
Soulcalibur was named as the number one best Dreamcast game by Game Informer. In 2009, IGN ranked Soulcalibur as the fifth best Dreamcast game, while ScrewAttack ranked it sixth. GamesRadar named Soulcalibur the best Dreamcast game of all time on their list. In 2005, GameSpot ranked Soulcalibur as the sixth best launch title yet, calling it "not only one of the greatest launch games or one of the greatest fighters, but one of the greatest games ever. Period." In 2022, Cultured Vultures ranked Soulcalibur as the best Dreamcast game of all time.

In addition, it is often considered to be one of the greatest games on all platforms, including:

- Game Informer (2001): "The Top 100 Games of All Time" (74th place).
- IGN (2003): "Top 100 Games" (38th place).
- Retro Gamer (2004): "Top 100 Games" (75th place).
- IGN (2005): "Top 100 Games" (43rd place).
- IGN (2006): "Readers' Choice The Top 100 Games Ever" (sixth place).
- Electronic Gaming Monthly (2006): "The Greatest 200 Videogames of Their Time" (22nd place).
- ScrewAttack (2007): "Top Ten Fighting Games" (seventh place).
- Cinema Blend (2008): "Top 10 Best Fighting Games of All Time" (fourth place).
- UGO.com (2010): "Top 25 Fighting Games of All Time" (second place).
- Complex (2011): "The 50 Best Fighting Games of All Time" (fifth place).
- Game Informer (2019): "30 best fighting game of all time" (third place)
