= List of machinima works =

This is a list of notable works made with machinima techniques, both listed as any short films, feature films, and web series.

== List ==
=== Feature films ===
Any machinima films need to require more than forty minutes of film length.

Year	Title	Director(s)	Production companies/Distributor	Genre	Game(s) or game engine(s)	Length	Note
2000	The Seal of Nehahra	J. Thaddeus Skubis	Mindcrime Productions	Action	Quake	235 mins	At a total length of three hours and fifty five minutes, it is the longest single-piece machinima production.
2002	Anachronox: The Movie	Jake Hughes	Ion Storm	Science fiction	Quake II engine (modified)	136 mins	
2006	BloodSpell	Hugh Hancock	Strange Company	Fantasy	Neverwinter Nights	90 mins	
2006	Borg War	Geoffrey James	Starbase 28	Action-adventure	Various Star Trek games	90 mins	Originally distributed as individual short episodes, footage for Borg War was produced using Trek-themed computer games and extensively edited to create the final movie, repurposing the games' voiceover clips to create a new plot.
2007	Tales of the Past III	Martin Falch	Falch Productions	Action drama	World of Warcraft	88 mins	
2010	War of Internet Addiction	Corndog	Oil Tiger Machinima Team	Political	World of Warcraft	97 mins	
2011	Vlogger	Ricard Gras and	Zentropa International Spain	Political thriller	Second Life	63 mins	
2013	Herobrine: A Lenda	Pac and Mike	Tazercraft	Action-adventure	Minecraft	232 mins	Consisted of all 15 episodes from the first season of the series.
2015	Herobrine: A Vingança	Pac and Mike	Tazercraft	Action-adventure	Minecraft	55 mins	Consisted of all 3 episodes from the second season of the series.
2015	Fuga Impossível	Pac and Mike	Tazercraft	Action-adventure	Minecraft	168 mins	Consisted of all 15 episodes from the first season of the series.
2016	Herobrine Origins: The Movie	Will Evans	EliteProductions	Supernatural horror	Minecraft	113 mins	
2019	The Last Guest	Matt	Studio Oblivious	Action	Roblox	90 mins	
2021	Songs of War	David R.B.	Squared Media (released under Black Plasma Studios)	Action	Minecraft	132 mins	Consisted of all 10 episodes from the first season of the series.
2022	Wrath of the Tarot Kings	Dustin Bell		Action-adventure	Red Dead Redemption 2	111 mins	
2023	Escape Bedrock Asylum	CiaránPixelz		Action comedy	Minecraft	98 mins	Consisted into a feature film from the first season of Minecraft: City of Merchants.
2023	Emesis Blue	Chad Payne	Fortress Films	Psychological horror	Team Fortress 2	108 mins	Movie made in Source Game engine
2024	Grand Theft Hamlet	Sam Crane and Pinny Grylls	Tull Stories	Documentary film	Grand Theft Auto Online	89 mins	
2024	Deadlands - A Fly Story	Julian Herm	TimeShadow Studios	Action, Fantasy	Minecraft	46 mins	Part of the larger universe.
2025	SI-BO - A Star Wars Story	Jannik Schwerdt	AREON Pictures	Action, Science-Fiction	Minecraft	55 mins	

=== Web short films / series ===
Title	Creator(s)	Genre	Game(s) or game engine(s)	Release date(s)	Note
The Adventures of Bill & John	KBS Productions	Comedy	Lock On: Modern Air Combat	2004–2006	
Am Ende der Distanz	David Riedel	Social drama	The Movies	2005	
Apartment Huntin'	ILL Clan	Comedy	Quake	1999	
Blahbalicious	Avatar, Wendigo, LordTrans	Comedy	Quake	1998	
BloodSpell	Strange Company	Fantasy	Neverwinter Nights	2006	
Civil Protection	Ross Scott	Comedy	Half-Life 2	2006-2012	
Clear Skies	Ian Chisholm	Science fiction	Half-Life 2 and Eve Online	2008-2011	
CNP	Alexo	Dark comedy	Halo 3, Halo: Reach, Garry's Mod	2008–present	
The Codex Series	Edgeworks Entertainment	Space opera	Halo 2	2005–2007	
Common Sense Cooking with Carl the Cook	ILL Clan	Comedy	Quake II	2003	
Counter-Strike For Kids	Janus Syndicate	Comedy/Parody	Counter-Strike: Source	2008	
Decisive Battles	The History Channel	Historical documentary	Rome: Total War	2004	
Definitely Accidental	Max "Mithzan" LaPlume	Dark comedy	Minecraft	2011-2012	
Deus Ex Machina	Jon Graham	Drama	Halo 3	2007–2008	
Diary of a Camper	United Ranger Films	Action	Quake	1996	
Explorer Chronicles	DANNYBOB/John	Mystery, thriller	Zoo tycoon 2	2007-2009	
Father Frags Best	Zarathustra Studios	Situational comedy, parody	Quake II	1999	
Fire Team Charlie	Fire Team Charlie	Comic science fiction	Halo: Combat Evolved	2003–2005	
Freeman's Mind	Ross Scott	Comic science fiction	Half-Life: Source	2007-2014	
Fractures	Rainimator	Action, Epic fantasy, Music Video	Minecraft	2017-Present	Story told through music videos prominently using songs by Blacklite District.
Freeman's Mind 2	Ross Scott	Comic science fiction	Half-Life 2	2017–present	
The French Democracy	Alex Chan	Political	The Movies	2005	
Half-Life: Full Life Consequences	Djy1991	Comedy	Garry's Mod	2008	
Hard Justice	Jon Graham	Comedy-drama	Halo 3	2008–2010	
Hardly Workin'	ILL Clan	Comedy	Quake II	2000	
I Misteri dell'Area 51	Ultra AleM	Comedy	GTA: San Andreas	2009–2011	
I'm Still Seeing Breen	Paul Marino	Music video	Half-Life 2	2005	
Jack and Holly	Blockhouse TV	Children's program	Moviestorm	2010	
Looking for the Truth	Eddie Duggan / Wilf Duggan	Drama	Moviestorm	2010	
Minecraft: City of Merchants	CiaránPixelz	Comedy, Action	Minecraft	2020–present	
Male Restroom Etiquette	Zarathustra Studios	Mockumentary	The Sims 2, SimCity 4	2006	
Molotov Alva and His Search for the Creator	Douglas Gayeton	Documentary	Second Life	2008	
Neverending Nights	Adam Freese, Tawmis Logue	Comic fantasy	Neverwinter Nights	2004–2006	
One Life Remaining	Jon Graham	Comedy drama	Halo 3	2009–2010	
Operation Bayshield	Clan Undead	Comedy	Quake	1997	
PANICS	Rooster Teeth Productions	Comic science fiction	F.E.A.R.	2005	
Playtime	CruelLEGACY Productions	Dramatic comedy	Halo: Reach	2010–2013	
Portal	G4	Comedy	Various	2002–2004	
Quad God	Tritin Films	Action	Quake III Arena	1999	
Red vs. Blue	Rooster Teeth Productions	Science fiction	Halo series, Marathon Trilogy	2003–2024	
The Rimmers	Aenus	Comedy	The Sims 4	2021–present	
Rise of the Spartans	Black Plasma Studios	Science fiction	Halo: Reach	2011–2013	
Serverblight	Two Idiot Germans	Horror	Source Filmmaker with Team Fortress 2	2024-present	
SMG4	Luke Lerdwichagul	Black comedy, sketch comedy, surreal comedy	Super Mario 64 with Garry's Mod and Source Filmmaker	2011-2025	
Songs of War	Squared Media (released under Black Plasma Studios)	Action	Minecraft	2019-2022	The series was officially cancelled in 2020 after the production and release of the first season, but the first episode of the second season was released in 2022.
The Strangerhood	Rooster Teeth Productions	Comedy	The Sims 2	2004–present	
Survival Roleplay	Daggerwin	Vlog series	Farming Simulator 17, Farming Simulator 19	2018–present	
Team Fabulous 2	Kitty0706	Comedy	Team Fortress 2 with Garry’s Mod	2012	A reanimation project was created in 2020
This Spartan Life	Bong + Dern Productions	Talk show	Halo 2, Halo 3	2005–2007	
Time Commanders	LionTV	Historical simulation	Rome: Total War	2003–2005	
Zinwrath	Dementia Studios, Myndflame Studios	Drama/Action	World of Warcraft	2005	

=== Other works inspired by or using machinima ===
Release date(s)	Title	Creator(s)	Genre	Game(s) or game engine(s)	Note
2000	Max Knight: Ultra Spy	Paul Bales, David Michael Latt, David Rimawi, and Sherri Strain.	Science-fiction	N/A	It features the use of video game related machinima as part of its production and storyline.
2006	South Park: Make Love, Not Warcraft	South Park Studios	Comedy	World of Warcraft	In season 10, episode 8. The episode was filmed most of its scenes to create a better emulation of the game.; It went on to win a Primetime Emmy Award for Outstanding Animated Program, becoming the first machinima to win an Emmy.
2007	CSI: Down the Rabbit Hole	Anthony E. Zuiker; Ann Donahue; Carol Mendelsohn	Drama, action	Second Life	
