= 2006 in machinima =

2006
← in machinima →

in film

in video gaming

The following is a list of notable machinima-related events in the year 2006. These include several new machinima productions, season finales, and the 2006 Machinima Festival.

== Events ==
- January 30 – Hugh Hancock announced his resignation as editor-in-chief of Machinima.com.
- March 20 – July 16 – The Academy of Machinima Arts & Sciences presented a machinima exhibition at the Australian Centre for the Moving Image.
- June 20 – Jeff Pulver announced that Chris Burke's This Spartan Life video blog about network neutrality won the "Save the Net" Viral Ad Contest.
- June 21 – Pentagon officials testified to the United States House Permanent Select Committee on Intelligence that a machinima video made using Electronic Arts' Battlefield 2 was terrorist propaganda. Georgia Institute of Technology assistant professor Ian Bogost and the video's creator disputed the claim.
- July 17 – The Academy of Machinima Arts & Sciences announced the 2006 Machinima Festival.
- November 1 – GameStop began to take preorders for Halo 3 and announced that the Legendary edition of the game will include content from Red vs. Blue and This Spartan Life.
- November 4 – November 5 – The 2006 Machinima Festival was held.
- November 26 – American football player Dallas Clark, a tight end for the Indianapolis Colts, complained about a commercial produced by Rooster Teeth Productions for Electronic Arts' video game Madden NFL 07. In the commercial, he is tackled by Philadelphia Eagles players.
- November 30 – Rooster Teeth Productions released a director's cut of the controversial advertisement involving Dallas Clark; in it, Clark plays and dominates every position.

== Notable releases ==
- February 9 – The first season of ILL Clan's Tra5hTa1k with ILL Will premiered.
- February 9 – Edgeworks Entertainment announced The Heretic, a prequel to The Codex.
- April 1 – Season 4 of Rooster Teeth Productions' Red vs. Blue ended with episode 77.
- April 26 – Strange Company released the first episode of BloodSpell.
- April 27 – Season 1 of The Strangerhood ended with episode 17.
- May 4 – Red vs. Blue Season Four and The Strangerhood Season One were released on DVD.
- May 6 – Video blog 5 for This Spartan Life, which concerns network neutrality, was released.
- June 16 – Rooster Teeth Productions announced its new mini-series Red vs. Blue: Out of Mind.
- August 29 – The first season of Tra5hTa1k with ILL Will ended with episode 10.
- September 4 – Red vs. Blue: Out of Mind ended with episode 5.
- September 28 – The second season of TrashTa1k with ILL Will began.
- September 30 – Season 5 of Red vs. Blue began for website sponsors with episode 78.
- October 4 – "Make Love, Not Warcraft", an episode of Comedy Central's animated series South Park, aired. As a result of cooperation with Blizzard Entertainment, the episode features segments of World of Warcraft machinima.
- December 8 – The last episode of Strange Company's BloodSpell, episode 14, was released.

== Active series ==
- BloodSpell (premiered 2006)
- Neverending Nights (premiered 2004)
- Red vs. Blue (premiered 2003)
- Red vs. Blue: Out of Mind (2006)
- This Spartan Life (premiered 2005)
- The Strangerhood (2004–2006)
- Tra5hTa1k with ILL Will (premiered 2006)

== Awards ==
=== Academy of Machinima Arts & Sciences ===
- Best Picture: The Adventures of Bill & John: Episode II
- Best Series: The Fixer
- Best Direction: Edge of Remorse
- Best Virtual Performance: Puppeteering: Tra5hTa1k with ILL Will
- Best Virtual Performance: Custom Animation: Company of Heroes
- Best Voice-Acting Performance: Deviation
