= 2004 in machinima =

2004
← in machinima →

in film

in video gaming

The following is a list of notable machinima-related events in the year 2004.

== Events ==
- March 11 – The ILL Clan co-hosted the Florida Film Festival using their characters Lenny and Larry Lumberjack.
- March 16 – Epic Games released its first-person shooter (FPS) computer game Unreal Tournament 2004.
- November 9 – Bungie released its FPS video game Halo 2, which is used in multiple machinima series.
- November 16 – Valve released its FPS computer game Half-Life 2.

== Notable releases ==
- January 3 – Season 2 of Rooster Teeth Productions' Red vs. Blue began with the premiere of episode 20 at the Lincoln Center for the Performing Arts.
- July 11 – Season 2 of Red vs. Blue ended with episode 38.
- October 18 – Rooster Teeth Productions released the first episode of its new series, The Strangerhood.
- November 28 – GW Films and Chipmunk Ninjas collaborated to make the popular film ClanWars.

== Active series ==
- Fire Team Charlie (2003–2005)
- Decisive Battles (2004)
- Lenny & Larry on the Campaign Trail (2004)
- Neverending Nights (premiered 2004)
- Red vs. Blue (2003–2007)
- The Strangerhood (2004–2006)
- Time Commanders (2003–2005)

== Awards ==
=== Rockets on Prisoner ===
- Best Movie: Fire Team Charlie episode 13
