= 2007 in machinima =

2007
← in machinima →

in film

in video gaming

The following is a list of notable machinima-related events in 2007.

== Events ==
- January 31 – Phil Rice's work Male Restroom Etiquette, made with the Electronic Arts games The Sims 2 and SimCity 4, was showcased in Animation World Network's Best of the Web 2007.
- February 24 – February 25 – The Australian Centre for the Moving Image hosted a machinima film festival, presented by the Academy of Machinima Arts & Sciences.
- October 12 – October 14 – The first Machinima Festival Europe was held in Leicester.
- October 24 – ILL Clan as part of the Electric Sheep Company produced 20 minutes of machinima shown during an episode of CSI: NY entitled "Down the Rabbit Hole", made within the virtual world of Second Life.

== Notable releases ==
- February 9 – The Heretic premiered.
- May 18 – The Heretic ended with episode 7.
- May 19 – The release of episode 4 of This Spartan Life was completed.
- June 28 – Red vs. Blue Season Five ended with episode 100.
- December 3 - Freeman's Mind premiered.

== Active series ==
- 1-800-Magic (2007)
- The Heretic (2007)
- Neverending Nights (premiered 2004)
- Red vs. Blue (2003–2007)
- Red vs. Blue: Recovery One (2007)
- This Spartan Life (premiered 2005)
