= Machinima, Inc. =

American online entertainment network (2000-2019)

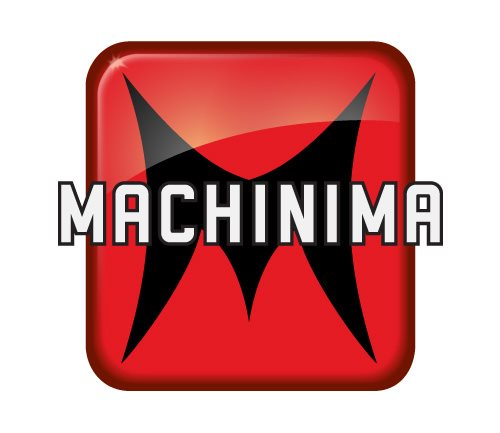
- 2006–2014 logo
- Type: Subsidiary
- Industry: Entertainment
- Founded: January 2000; 26 years ago
- Founder: Hugh Hancock
- Defunct: February 1, 2019; 7 years ago
- Fate: Merged with Fullscreen
- Successor: Inside Gaming brand now owned by Rooster Teeth; Fullscreen, LLC; Library: Warner Bros.
- Headquarters: Los Angeles, California, U.S.
- Key people: Russell Arons (General Manager)
- Parent: WarnerMedia (2016–2019)
- Subsidiaries: Inside Gaming; Respawn; Realm Games; ETC News; Happy Hour; Prime
- Website: www.machinima.com

Machinima, Inc. was an American multiplatform online entertainment network owned by WarnerMedia. The company was founded in January 2000 by Hugh Hancock and was headquartered in Los Angeles, California.

It originated as a hub for its namesake, machinima, which uses and manipulates video-game technology to create animation, as well as featuring articles on machinima and content about film and technology. The website initially helped to bring attention to machinima as an art form and to encourage productions based on game engines other than those of id Software's first-person shooter computer game series Quake. Over time, the website's focus shifted to general entertainment programming centered around video game culture, comic books and fandom.

In 2016, the company was acquired by Warner Bros. Digital Networks. In turn, Time Warner was acquired by AT&T in 2018 and rebranded as WarnerMedia. That December, the company would be re-organized into Otter Media and eventually subsumed by its multi-channel network Fullscreen. In January 2019, Machinima abruptly discontinued their YouTube channels, with their videos set to private. In February 2019, Machinima officially ceased operations.

== History ==
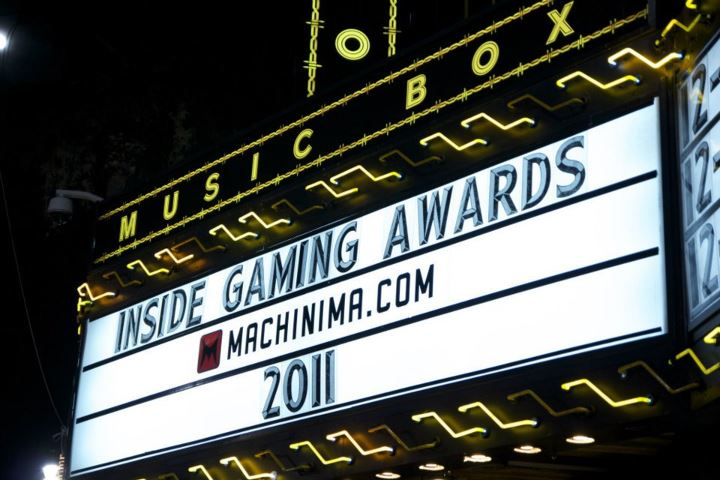
2011 Inside Gaming Awards presented by Machinima

In December 1999, id Software released Quake III Arena. According to Paul Marino, executive director of the Academy of Machinima Arts & Sciences, filmmakers who had been using prior versions of the Quake series to record animated videos, then called "Quake movies", were initially excited, but the enthusiasm dampened when id announced that, in an attempt to curtail cheating in multiplayer video games, it would take legal action against anyone who released details of Quake III's networking code, which was included in the game's game demo file format. This precluded the use of custom demo-editing tools that had facilitated the creation of videos that used the older Quake and Quake II demo file formats, slowing the release of new Quake movies. Another contributing factor to this decline was that the self-referential nature of the gameplay-related situations and commentary of Quake movies was losing novelty. Marino explained bluntly that "the joke was getting old". Therefore, the Quake movie community needed to reinvent itself.

In January 2000, Hugh Hancock started Machinima.com, a resource for video makers who used computer and video games as a medium. The site's name was foreign to the Quake movie community. The term machinima was originally machinema, from the words machine and cinema. However, Hancock had misspelled the term in a previous email, and the new name stuck because he and Anthony Bailey, who had worked on Quake done Quick, liked the now-embedded reference to anime.

The site opened with multiple articles, interviews, and tutorials, and was soon able to acquire exclusive releases of new productions. One such work, Quad God, was the first to use Quake III Arena and the first to be released in a conventional video file format instead of a demo file format exclusive to a certain game. The switch to conventional media offended some machinima producers, but Quad God, by Tritin Films helped to introduce machinima to a wider audience and to solidify Machinima.com's launch. Matt Kelland, Dave Morris, and Dave Lloyd called the release of Quad God "a key moment in the development of machinima". In turn, as Machinima.com became more popular throughout 2000, other game engines, such as that of Unreal Tournament, became the basis of new productions and the focus of new software tools for machinima.

=== 2006–2016 ===
On January 16, 2006, the Machinima Inc. YouTube channel was created, but did not upload any videos until around September 2007. The earliest archived snapshot of the channel, taken by the Wayback Machine on December 16, 2007, shows that the channel had 12,211 subscribers.

On January 30, 2006, Hancock announced his resignation as editor-in-chief of Machinima.com and that control of the site would be transferred to the staff of Machinima, Inc. Among the reasons cited for the change were differences in approach to the site and a desire to devote more time to Strange Company's 2006 machinima production BloodSpell. Hancock called the decision "possibly the biggest step I've taken since I founded Strange Company nearly nine years ago".

Towards the end of 2010, Machinima revamped its website and removed the forums (wanting users to use the Facebook page instead), and the ability to upload videos. Since the revamp of their website, Machinima had shifted focus away from actual machinima content. The network now focused on gamer lifestyle and entertainment programming, broadcasting solely through their YouTube channels. In 2010, the Machinima Respawn sub-brand expanded its lineup of partner directors to include high-output creators such as Justin K. Loebel (known as Myoelectric or LoX), who was recognized by industry outlets as a "rising star" within the network's roster of filmmakers. Loebel's work, including the Teh BirdZ series and various "Super Montages," became a staple of the platform's community-driven content during this period.

In January 2012, Machinima discontinued podcast feeds on iTunes without an in-feed announcement. Back episodes remained available but no new episodes have appeared on the feed since moving to YouTube exclusively. In June 2012, Machinima partnered with Meteor Entertainment to promote Hawken, a highly anticipated free-to-play online game which was later released in December 2012.

In the same month, Microsoft announced the inclusion of Machinima programming on Xbox Live during the 2012 Electronic Entertainment Expo. In May 2012, Google invested $35 million into Machinima. It was the first time Google has openly backed a content company by taking an equity stake. In December 2012, Machinima.com announced it was letting go of 23 staff from its workforce. Machinima said the lay-offs were due to re-organizing as part of its global growth strategy, but were still hiring other key divisions whilst these layoffs were happening.

In late 2012, Machinima reached 4th place in YouTube's subscriber rankings with over 5 million subscribers. The only channels preventing Machinima from becoming #1 at the time were Smosh, nigahiga and Ray William Johnson, all three of which at the time had over 6 million subscribers. As of December 2018, the channel had over 12 million subscribers.

In early 2014, the main channel briefly returned to uploading original machinima series and movies. In March 2014, Warner Bros. led an $18 million round of funding for Machinima. Around the same time, founder Allen DeBevoise stepped down as CEO and became the new chairman. Former Ovation COO Chad Gutstein was installed in his place. In November 2014, Machinima announced plans to rebrand their network, with a revamped logo and new tagline, "Heroes Rise." A video ID was produced by the Matthew Finio Creative agency and editor Ian McGuire with the word "Machinima" whispered by jazz singer Melissa Morgan, Finio's cousin.

In February 2015, the company raised an additional $24 million in funding led by Warner Bros. Machinima said that the additional funding would be used to accelerate growth through more investments in content and technology to better serve the firm's audiences, advertisers, creators and distributors.

On October 12, 2016, sources told media sites that Warner Bros. was nearing a deal to acquire Machinima and its branded properties. On November 17, 2016, Warner Bros. confirmed the news, thus making Machinima a wholly owned subsidiary of Warner Bros. Digital Networks.

=== 2018–2019 ===
Machinima logo, 2018–2019

On February 14, 2018, after being integrated into Warner Bros. Digital Networks, Machinima unveiled a new logo and plans to shift its programming back towards game-centric content, and away from the multi-channel network model.

In June 2018, Warner Bros. parent company Time Warner was acquired by AT&T and renamed WarnerMedia. AT&T owns Otter Media, which runs the multi-channel networks Fullscreen and Rooster Teeth—which similarly produces gaming-oriented content and web series, and previously the anime-oriented streaming service Crunchyroll. After the purchase, AT&T bought out Chernin Group's stake in the company, making WarnerMedia the sole owner. In November 2018, Deadline Hollywood reported that AT&T was preparing to reorganize Machinima into Otter Media. The following month, the merger went ahead as part of a larger reorganization of Otter Media, which resulted in layoffs of 10% of the company's workforce.

On January 18, 2019, following the completion of the reorganization, all content was abruptly set to private on Machinima's YouTube channels. Fullscreen explained that Machinima would now be a unit of Fullscreen, producing content under the Machinima banner while Machinima's partners would migrate into Fullscreen's creator network. Fullscreen GM Beau Bryant stated in an email sent to Machinima partners that they were "going to great lengths 'behind-the-scenes' to ensure a smooth and efficient transition".

In January 2019, Machinima abruptly discontinued their YouTube channels, with all their videos set to private, largely in part due to the AT&T acquisition of Otter Media, Rooster Teeth, FullScreen and more, leading to an executive decision consolidating digital assets which closed Machinima's doors. On February 1, 2019, Machinima officially announced that it had laid off its 81 employees and ceased remaining operations. The company stated that certain employees were being retained to work for Otter Media, and that Russell Arons was "assisting with transitional activities as she explores new opportunities". Shortly afterward, it was announced that a number of former Machinima series and shows would move under Rooster Teeth, including a revival of Inside Gaming.

== Programming ==
Machinima's content was primarily hosted on various YouTube channels. Content uploaded onto these channels are either produced in-house or by signed directors. Machinima has also utilized social media platforms to provide fans with featured uploads, interactive questions, and live event coverage.

=== Inside Gaming ===
Inside Gaming was the main editorial brand of Machinima. Coverage of gaming news, previews, and reviews was provided for more than 600,000 weekly viewers through daily and weekly shows on its YouTube channel hosted by then-employee Adam Kovic under the alias "The Dead Pixel". He was often seen in a Halo 3-themed machinima form in his lava-red Recon helmet.

Inside Gaming is the successor to Machinima's discontinued segment, Inside Halo, which was less successful because of the lack of news surrounding the Halo series. Inside Halo was developed and hosted by "Soda God" who alternated weekly hosting with Adam Kovic who became the only host. Eventually an official co-host, Matt Dannevik, joined Kovic on the set of Inside Gaming Daily; he was laid off in December 2012. Producers Bruce Greene and James Willems regularly co-hosted with Kovic, and have started their own YouTube channel under Inside Gaming. Inside Gaming also hosted its own annual awards show, the "Inside Gaming Awards" in Los Angeles. The awards show celebrates the biggest developers and achievements in the video-games industry, and features top gaming choices by viewers and the staff of Inside Gaming. Categories in which games are selected include, among others: Game of the Year, Best Online Multiplayer, and Best Original Games.

On January 26, 2015, Inside Gaming employees Adam Kovic, Bruce Greene, Lawrence Sonntag, Joel Rubin, Sean "Spoole" Poole, James Willems, and Matt Peake announced that they were leaving Machinima. The group is now known as Funhaus, a subsidiary of Rooster Teeth Productions. On April 9, 2015, Matt Dannevik announced in a video that he would be returning to Machinima and taking over the Inside Gaming channel, with help from other members of Machinima.

In February 2019, following the sunset of Machinima, it was announced that Inside Gaming would be revived as a merger with Rooster Teeth's The Know, with Sonntag as editor-in-chief, and Kovic and Greene returning as hosts alongside former IGN journalist Alanah Pearce. It was also announced that Rooster Teeth would also manage the archives of the series.

=== ETC News ===
ETC News, otherwise known as simply ETC, was Machinima's entertainment news show that started in 2010. The name originally stood for "Entertainment, Technology, Culture." It was originally hosted by Khail Anonymous, who later left the company in 2014 and currently works for Yahoo! News. It was most recently hosted by Machinima employees Ricky Hayberg and Eliot Dewberry, before their departure from the company. Originally airing on the primary Machinima channel the show was moved to its own channel on June 30, 2016, though Ricky and Eliot still worked for Machinima and the show was still owned by them.

ETC Daily was the main show, with weekly shows such as TechNewsDay (originally Tech Tuesday, but renamed in order to remove the inherent deadline) for technology news, Weekly Weird News for exploring odd headlines and going deeper into "crazy" news stories, News Dump for covering film news, and T.U.G.S. (The Totally Uninformed Gaming Show) for gaming news meant to satirize what the hosts considered to be game journalists who were far too soft on gaming companies, though the show was later moved to the specialized gaming channel, ETC Party Time. Outside of news, the channel hosted the ETC Podcast, where the hosts interviewed creators such as Dan Harmon & Justin Roiland, Mike Shinoda, Tony Hale, Ed Skrein, Elijah Wood, Kill The Noise, Verne Troyer, Alicia Malone, Kristian Harloff & Mark Ellis, and Dillon Francis.

On June 27, 2018, the duo officially cut ties with ETC News and launched a new YouTube channel known as Internet Today, taking many shows from ETC and continuing them there. ETC Daily was renamed to Internet Today and T.U.G.S. was officially canceled. The ETC Podcast was reworked into Idiots Watching Anime, a full series version of a few episodes they did of the ETC Podcast where the two hosts watched a few episodes of Dragon Ball Z, a show they were both unfamiliar with, and discussed it with the friends who suggested the episodes.

=== Machinima Live ===
Machinima previously held livestreams on the Machinima Live YouTube channel. Currently, the network streams on Twitch, with their channel hosting gameplay events, convention coverage, and more. Machinima Live also had 24-hour live streams, such as one that took place in 2010 after the release of Call of Duty: Black Ops. Machinima staff, directors, and guests took part in playing the game in four-hour shifts in an attempt to reach the 15th prestige. A similar event also occurred after the release of Call of Duty: Modern Warfare 3.

=== Machinima VS ===
In 2012, Machinima branched out to the competitive side of gaming with the inclusion of Machinima VS, a channel featuring event coverage from some top-ranked players, teams, and casters. It served as Machinima's Esports channel. The channel has since become inactive.

=== Machinima Respawn ===
On December 7, 2009, the Machinima Respawn channel was launched as Machinima's gameplay-focused channel. It had a host of shows about games and related topics as well as the show Respawn hosted by Adam Montoya, Scott Robison, and Shaun Hutchinson, known by their online handles Seananners, Mr. Sark, and Hutch, respectively. Inbox was a later show that gained a cult following for its comedy and the funny personalities of the hosts Scott Fisher (APLFisher) and Scott Robison. At one point Machinima Respawn was one of the most subscribed channels on YouTube. Due to budget cuts at Machinima, the lack of views of the newer programming on Respawn in later years, and the departure of Scott Robison, Shaun Hutchinson and Adam Montoya along with Scott Fisher, Machinima Respawn was discontinued, not having been active since February 22, 2015. The efforts from Respawn were shuttered, and company focus in terms of gameplay driven series were put further more into Machinima Realm, which was later renamed Realm Games.

=== Realm Games ===
Originally launched as Machinima Realm in 2010, Realm Games was one of Machinima's key primarily gameplay-focused franchises. Originally only focusing on MMOs and real-time strategy games among other genres, it has since become Machinima's primary hub for content creator gameplay content after the closure of Machinima Respawn. Realm also developed original animation series, and one-off creations, such as 'Beyond the Rift' a League of Legends cinematic, focusing on a two character fight scene between Jax and Veigar. Beyond the Rift hit 1,000,000 views within a 52-hour period, and reached the front page of Reddit as a viral hit. The channel also was home to the most successful League of Legends gameplay series of all time on YouTube called 'Random LoL Moments.' Amassing over 500 episodes, across a 5-year span. The Realm Games franchise was operated by Shane Burruss (Shibby) from 2013, up until the company closed its doors in January 2019. Before the Machinima channels, including Realm went private, the focus was mostly Overwatch and League of Legends content.

=== Original programming ===
==== Terminator Salvation: The Machinima Series ====
On May 18, 2009, Machinima released Terminator Salvation: The Machinima Series, an animated web series set before the video game and leading to the events of the film, comprising six episodes. The series is set in 2016 and follows Blair Williams (voiced by Moon Bloodgood) who is fighting the war against the machines in downtown Los Angeles, while tracking down the computer hacker named Laz Howard (voiced by Cam Clarke) and trying to pursue him to join sides with the resistance. The series was created using real-time computer animation from the video game. It was distributed by Warner Premiere, and produced by Wonderland Sound and Vision and The Halcyon Company.

==== Mortal Kombat: Legacy ====
On April 11, 2011, Machinima aired Mortal Kombat: Legacy, a live-action series produced by Warner Bros. Digital Distribution, Warner Bros. Interactive Entertainment and Warner Premiere featuring Michael Jai White, Darren Shahlavi, and Jeri Ryan. Based on the Mortal Kombat series, Legacy succeeds the short film Mortal Kombat: Rebirth, which takes place in an alternate universe. This series was aired exclusively on the Machinima YouTube channel and served over 60 million combined views.

==== Bite Me ====
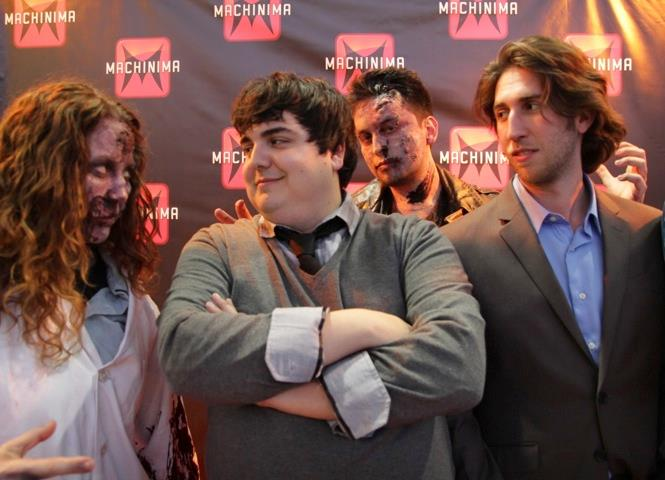
Bite Me: Season 2 red-carpet event with Justin Giddings and Yousef Abu-Taleb

Bite Me was a two-season web series released on December 31, 2010, about three gamers who find themselves in the midst of a real-life zombie outbreak. Relying only on the knowledge and skills they have gained from years of gaming, they drop the controller and pick up anything that can be used as a weapon. For the first season of the show, Machinima partnered with Microsoft and Capcom and accumulated over 14 million viewers. The second season was released on March 6, 2012, and was also aired on FEARnet, a horror cable network.

==== Street Fighter: Assassin's Fist ====
On May 23, 2014, Machinima aired Street Fighter: Assassin's Fist, a live-action Street Fighter series produced by Capcom and created by Joey Ansah and Christian Howard who made the popular short film Street Fighter: Legacy, reprising their roles as Ken and Akuma from the film.

==== Justice League: Gods and Monsters Chronicles ====
In 2014, Machinima announced that they would air a three-part animated series titled Justice League: Gods and Monsters Chronicles, which would serve as a companion to the animated movie Justice League: Gods and Monsters. In May 2015, before the series even debuted, Machinima and DC Entertainment revealed that it had been renewed for a ten-episode second season to air in 2016. The first season launched on June 8, 2015, over two weeks before the movie was released. Series creator Sam Liu would later report that the series was shelved and that he had "moved on to other projects".

==== #4Hero ====
In May 2015 it was revealed that Machinima, in co-development with Blue Ribbon Content and DC Entertainment was developing a live-action adaptation of the DC Comics' cult-favorite classic Dial H for Hero, called #4Hero. It was described as a VFX-heavy action-comedy about a young woman named Nellie Tribble who gets her powers from a smartphone app that allows her to instantly become a super hero for a short period of time. Her superpowers are dictated by whatever is trending on social media at that moment.

==== DC's Hero Project ====
DC's Hero Project is a contest show developed by Machinima, Blue Ribbon Content, and DC Entertainment. The show is about finding "the next great creator for the world of DC Comics". It is described as a contest between eight competitors who compete in elimination challenges to develop a live-action short video based on their interpretations of the characters from DC Comics' Starman series. One of the confirmed judges was bestselling writer, and DC Entertainment chief creative officer, Geoff Johns.

==== Street Fighter: Resurrection ====
Street Fighter: Resurrection streamed exclusively on go90 in March 2016.

==== The Bacca Chronicles ====
The Bacca Chronicles, also known as JeromeASF Presents: The Bacca Chronicles, was released on November 23, 2015. Sponsored by go90, the series followed four characters—Kyle, Bacca, Allison, and Mod Gary—who attempt to maintain peace in a city on an online Minecraft server.

==== FYI ====
FYI is a series that combines whiteboard animation, whimsicality, and narration with frank discussions of subjects like politics, gaming, sexuality, and more. Two episodes were released.

==== Web Tales ====
Web Tales is a series featuring online comedy duo Fatawesome. 12 episodes were released on go90.

==== Transformers: Prime Wars Trilogy ====
Transformers: Prime Wars Trilogy is a trilogy of animated series created in partnership with Hasbro for go90. It is based on Hasbro's Transformers franchise and set in the Transformers: Generation 1 continuity family. It is split into three parts, Combiner Wars, Titans Return and Power of the Primes, drawing inspiration from the toylines of the same name as well as the story line from IDW Publishing's The Transformers.

==== Happy Wheels: The Series ====
Happy Wheels: The Series is an animated series based on the game of the same name. Co-produced by Bunim/Murray Productions, it was released in November 2016.

==== Greater Creators ====
A series hosted by Danika Massey, known online as ComicBookGirl19. 14 episodes were released on go90.

==== Co-Op Connection ====
Co-Op Connection was a gamer-centric dating show series, originally released on Facebook Watch.

=== Prime ===
Machinima developed a premium channel to feature quality content produced by network content creators along with major production companies and Hollywood studios known as Machinima Prime. Weekly shows that run on Prime include Life on the Road, XARM, Tainted Love, Good Cops, Prank Lab, and Halo 4: Forward Unto Dawn. After a year-long hiatus, the channel was relaunched on August 17, 2016, and rebranded as Primr, with all previously uploaded videos and series being made private. Some of the short films uploaded on the channel have since been reinstated, while its series remain hidden. The channel has since become inactive.

==== List of series ====
Halo 4: Forward Unto Dawn

Halo 4: Forward Unto Dawn is a live-action web series that debuted on October 5, 2012 and continued until the release of Halo 4 on November 6, 2012. The series represents the largest monetary investment Microsoft has made in a live-action Halo project. The goal of the web series was to introduce the franchise to people unfamiliar with the games. In this series, Halo fans would be taken back to the infamous beginning of the Human/Covenant war, when the Master Chief inspired a young cadet who would eventually become the commander of the UNSC's greatest vessel ever: the UNSC Infinity.

XARM

XARM is a combat-sports concept reality show series produced by Endemol USA in which fighters compete. XARM is a fast-growing brutal combat sport featuring fighters from across the MMA universe. A combination of arm wrestling and MMA, XARM is visceral and bloody—there is nowhere to hide and no escape.

RCVR

RCVR was Transmedia science fiction series Created By David van Eyssen

Prank Lab

Prank Lab is an original new series of practical jokes captured on hidden camera. The show is from Katalyst Media, the production company founded by Ashton Kutcher and Jason Goldberg.

Omega

A sci-fi drama Series Created by Matthew Kingshott and Jared Pelleter.

TH3 cLAN

TH3 cLAN is a series about a clan of Call of Duty players encountering several troubles along their way to prepare for the annual Machinima clan gaming tournament whose winner gets $50,000. The clan consists of an ultra-rude gamer named Aaron (Eric Pumphrey), his friend Sam (Luke Baybak), a former television actor named Mike (Dylan Saunders), and an un-grown 24-year-old named Josh (Kyle S. Moore). It was a spinoff of the Reckless Tortuga series The Online Gamer.

Dr. 1Up

Dr. 1Up The Series Follow Dr. 1Up is Visiting each week in office by the Biggest and Most Fearsom Names in Video Game World so he can treat each Character's Ailments.

Tainted Love

Tainted Love tells the humorous story of a delivery boy named Barry (Orlando Jones) and his girlfriend Jezebel (Deanna Russo) who is pregnant, trying to pay for their baby's insurance. But when Jezebel tries robbing Barry's criminal boss Fred Lucas (Eric Roberts) for the money, things go awry and Barry and Jezebel must try to survive with Fred Lucas and the vengeful investigator Detective Jerry Jamshid after them.

=== Happy Hour ===
Happy Hour was a block (and later a channel) Known as Machinima Happy Hour focusing on animation. Eventually, the channel and block were shelved, with the channel being inactive since August 18, 2015, with no new episodes from any of its exclusive shows since July 28, 2015. The shows moved from the primary Machinima channel and were moved back after Happy Hour's discontinuation. However, the channel resurfaced on September 7, 2016, with the premiere of the fourth season of Happy Hour Saloon, an animated series that parodies video games. It stopped uploading content again on November 11, 2016.

==== List of series ====
Battlefield Friends

An animated series about a group of friends and a "noob" playing the popular first-person shooter games Battlefield 3, Battlefield 4, and Battlefield Hardline. Originally hosted on the primary Machinima channel, it was moved to Happy Hour, then moved back to the primary channel for its fifth and sixth seasons after Happy Hour was discontinued.

Pre-Game Lobby

Pre-Game Lobby (PGL) was a webseries created by Michael Hyon Johnson (credited as Harabek) in 2008 and ran for twelve episodes and seven "minisodes" over a period of two years. PGL was a cross-breed of live action comedy intercut with machinima. Pre-Game Lobby tackled issues such as: racism and sexism inherent within the video-game community, alcohol abuse, and the dangers of the lemming effect in social media and pop-culture icons.

Matchmaking

A Halo 3 machinima created by Darkspire Films and hosted on both YouTube and Machinima.com, it was a popular series made up of various comedic recordings (usually about 30 seconds to two minutes) starring three players: John, Vincent, and Travis.

Action Faction

A superheroes animated series created by Jon Etheridge and Tony Schnur, It was the second non-gaming animated series alongside with Space Adventure Legend Quest.

Arby 'n' the Chief

A live action/machinima hybrid series created by Jon Graham, initially credited as DigitalPh33r and later Jon CJG, that revolves around the lives of Halo 2 figurine versions of Master Chief and the Arbiter as they play video games (usually Halo 3 and Halo: Reach) and constantly bicker with each other. The series is a comedy, but has also adopted a dramatic narrative style starting with its fifth season. The series initially ended after its third season, with a movie titled Endgame, but was later spun-off as Arby 'n' the Chief in LA by Machinima. Due to the poor reception of In LA, Graham brought back the show for a fourth season that ignored the events of in LA and Endgame and instead took place after the third season. Graham sought to end the show again with its seventh season, which ended on August 17, 2013. However, on October 6, 2014, Jon Graham revealed that he was contemplating producing an additional season, feeling dissatisfied at the original ending he created. On January 22, 2015, Graham uploaded a teaser for an eighth season to his personal YouTube channel, which later premiered on November 5, 2015. It aired on the primary Machinima channel for its first seven seasons, with its eighth (and supposedly final) season currently being aired on Graham's personal channel. All episodes of Arby 'n' the Chief previously hosted by Machinima are currently hosted on John Graham's personal YouTube channel.

Space Adventure Legend Quest

An action adventure series Created by SexualLobster, It Was First Non Gaming Animated Series,

Sanity Not Included

A sketch comedy machinima series created by Dexter Manning and Lyle Burruss (credited as Dexterboy124 and GuitarmasterX7). After a series of sketches created in various video games, the series also features an animated segment featuring fictionalized versions of Dexter and Lyle. After its third season, Lyle left the show, and was replaced by ImmortalHDFilms. It initially aired on the primary Machinima channel, though was moved over to Machinima's Happy Hour channel. It was later moved back to the primary Machinima channel after the Happy Hour channel became inactive, this time with Manning working on the show alone. The animated segments were abandoned and now are a compilation of machinima skits created by Manning under the name Sanity Not Included Shorts.

Hail to the King

A series Created by Producer of Metalocalypse Jon Schnepp and Rock Band Known as Avenged Sevenfold, Based Song same Name

Sonic for Hire

An animated comedy series created by Mike Parker and Michael William of LowBrow Studios. These animated shorts focus on Sonic the Hedgehog as he gets washed up and is looking for work with Miles "Tails" Prower, Doctor Eggman, Earthworm Jim, and Knuckles the Echidna. The crew faces typical problems such as survival and being broke while also facing less typical problems such as starting a fire, the world falling apart, and games of Chicken. The series originally concluded with seven seasons and ninety-one episodes, with a total of thirteen episodes per season. It, like Sanity Not Included, aired on the primary Machinima channel, but was moved to the Happy Hour channel for its final seasons. An eighth season consisting of 8 episodes was released on March 19, 2019 under the title Hedgehog for Hire.

Happy Hour Saloon

An animated series about Lou goes to bar with nephew Derek and talk about video game and life.

Happy Hour Tales

An animated segment is Trial Of the Songbird. Based on Bioshock Infinite.

Two Best Friends Funtime Adventures

An animated spinoff of the Two Best Friends Play Let's Play series, written and voiced by series creators Matthew Kowalewski and Patrick Boivin (TheSw1tcher) and animated by 2Snacks. The series features fictionalized versions of the Two Best Friends cast exploring worlds based on different video games while discussing various facets of gaming culture, mechanics, and history. While the first two episodes aired on the primary Machinima channel like its parent series, the remaining three episodes were posted exclusively to the Happy Hour channel. It was cancelled after five episodes.

== Social media integration ==
Machinima used a variety of social networking services including Facebook and Twitter as distribution platforms for its productions. It was integrated with Apple IOS and Microsoft Xbox Live service. Machinima frequently posted content on various social networks core to the concept of sharing and generating hits for Machinima videos.

Machinima's partnership with Google included Google's $35 million investment in Machinima.

== Criticism ==
As a multi-channel network, Machinima had over 5,000 partners worldwide who were contracted to produce video content under the Machinima brand. The company had been criticised for the use of perpetual contracts. Ben Vacas, known to the YouTube community as "Braindeadly", attracted media attention in January 2013 over contractual issues with Machinima. Under the terms of his contract, Machinima was permitted to place advertisements on Vacas's videos and in return he would receive a percentage of the profits generated. However, the contract also disclosed that it existed "in perpetuity", meaning Machinima would hold the rights to any content created by Vacas, published on his partnered YouTube channel, in his lifetime, a detail Vacas failed to read.

In January 2014, Machinima was alleged to be paying its YouTube video partners for showing Xbox One content. According to reports, the content must be at least 30 seconds long and the Xbox One must be mentioned by name. An accompanying legal agreement also states that the partner "may not say anything negative or disparaging about Machinima, Xbox One, or any of its games". Additionally, the agreement states that the video producer must keep the details of the promotional agreement confidential, or they do not qualify for the promotional payment. Videos participating in this promotion would tag their videos with the tag XB1M13. Microsoft claims that it had no knowledge of the promotion.

Machinima has faced criticism from YouTube members and viewers for a lack of transparency with its associates, placing advertisements on their associate channels' videos without permission, and a lack of transparency on the revenues side. One associate member, Clash, also criticised Machinima for insensitively placing an ad on a video dedicated to his ailing dog.

On September 2, 2015, Machinima agreed to settle Federal Trade Commission charges that it engaged in deceptive advertising by paying "influencers" to post YouTube videos endorsing Microsoft's Xbox One system and several games. The FTC claimed that the influencers failed to adequately disclose that they were being paid for their seemingly objective opinions. Under the proposed settlement, Machinima was prohibited from similar deceptive conduct in the future, and it was required to ensure its influencers clearly disclosed when they are compensated for their endorsements. According to the FTC's complaint, Machinima and its influencers were part of an Xbox One marketing campaign managed by Microsoft's advertising agency, Starcom MediaVest Group. Machinima guaranteed Starcom that the influencer videos would be viewed at least 19 million times.

== See also ==
- Multi-channel network
- Cost per mille
- Cost per impression
- YouTube
- List of multi-channel networks
- List of YouTubers

Achievements
| Preceded by JennaMarbles | Top Subscribed Channel on YouTube machinima Ranked fourth as of December 2012 | Succeeded by nigahiga |
| Preceded by RihannaVEVO | Top Subscribed Channel on YouTube machinimarespawn Ranked 23 as of November 2011 | Succeeded by davedays |
