= The Adventures of Chico and Guapo =

2006 American animated television series

- Created by: Orlando Jones; P. J. Pesce; Paul D'Acri
- Country of origin: United States
- Original language: English
- No. of seasons: 1
- No. of episodes: 5

Production
- Running time: 30 minutes
- Production companies: MTV/Remote Productions; One Red Room

Original release
- Network: MTV2
- Release: June 10 – July 29, 2006

The Adventures of Chico and Guapo is an American adult animated television series that originally aired on MTV2. Set in New York City, the show is about two interns trying to get ahead in the music business. Chico and Guapo work at Mr. Angelo's recording studio. The series follows their misadventures, and also features Chico and Guapo's commentary on real TV shows while channel surfing in Mr. Angelo's office (similar to Beavis and Butt-Head, Station Zero, and DJ & the Fro).

Shorts of the cartoon originally aired on The Orlando Jones Show on FX prior to becoming a regular series on MTV2. All five episodes were released on DVD.

== Characters ==
- Chico Bustello (Voiced by Paul D'Acri) – A smart-mouthed janitor of Puerto Rican descent working for Angelo Productions
- Guapo Martinez (Voiced by P. J. Pesce) – An obese janitor from the Dominican Republic who works with Chico
- Concepción Rodríguez (Voiced by Orlando Jones) – A Latina receptionist from the Dominican Republic
- Hank Holiday (Voiced by Orlando Jones) – A gay music producer who gets all the credit for Cezar's work
- Cezar (Voiced by Paul D'Acri) – A producer and a musical genius, Chico's cousin
- Mr. Angelo (full name Frank C. Angelo) (Voiced by P. J. Pesce) – The owner of Angelo Productions, whose wife has been dead for 12 years and whose daughter Sophie is in love with Chico

== Episode guide ==
- 1st episode:
  - Gelatinous F.A.T.
  - Affirmative Reaction
  - Worker's Comp
  - Smackfight
  - America's Most Talented Fetus
- 2nd episode:
  - Pariah Scary
  - Too Hot for Teacher
  - Santeria
  - Gaupo's Dyslexia
  - The Gift
- 3rd episode:
  - Li'l Kwim
  - Morcilla Sausage
  - Standup Guy
  - Cezar's First
  - Mr. Angelo's Rug
- 4th episode:
  - Da Feud
  - Enter the Guapo
  - Bigfoot
  - Y tu Chico, Tambien
  - The Hanklick Maneuver
