= Tainted Love (web series) =

American comedy web series

- Genre: Crime comedy; Action comedy; Romantic comedy
- Created by: Orlando Jones; Avi Youabian
- Written by: Orlando Jones
- Directed by: Avi Youabian
- Starring: Orlando Jones; Deanna Russo; Maz Jobrani; Jim Jefferies; Eric Roberts
- Composers: Joey Newman; Matt Hutchinson; Hank Whitaker
- Country of origin: United States
- Original language: English
- No. of episodes: 6

Production
- Executive producer: Ron Bloom
- Producers: Ted Andre; Noam Dromi
- Editors: Avi Youabian; Ken Lamere
- Running time: 4–8 minutes
- Production company: From Drivey By Entertainment

Original release
- Network: Machinima
- Release: May 5 – June 6, 2013

Tainted Love is an American comedy web series created by Orlando Jones and Avi Youabian for Machinima.

== Episodes ==
No.	Title	Original release date
1	"Baby Mama Drama"	May 5, 2013
2	"Baby Got Back"	May 9, 2013
3	"Fly On The Wall"	May 16, 2013
4	"Back Door Action"	May 23, 2013
5	"Not So Tiny"	May 30, 2013
6	"I Shot the Sheriff"	June 6, 2013
