= Sleepy Hollow season 1 =

Season of television series

Sleepy Hollow
- Season 1
- Season 1 DVD cover
- No. of episodes: 13

Release
- Original network: Fox
- Original release: September 16, 2013 – January 20, 2014

Season chronology
- Next → Season 2

The first season of the Fox television series Sleepy Hollow premiered on September 16, 2013, and concluded January 20, 2014, consisting of 13 episodes.

== Cast and characters ==
=== Main cast ===
- Tom Mison as Ichabod Crane
- Nicole Beharie as Lt. Abigail "Abbie" Mills
- Orlando Jones as Captain Frank Irving
- Katia Winter as Katrina Crane

=== Recurring cast ===
- Lyndie Greenwood as Jennifer "Jenny" Mills
- Nicholas Gonzalez as Detective Luke Morales
- John Cho as Officer Andy Brooks
- Richard Cetrone, Jeremy Owens, Craig Branham and Neil Jackson as the Headless Horseman / Abraham Van Brunt
- D. J. Mifflin, George Ketsios, and Derek Mears as Moloch
- Clancy Brown as Sheriff August Corbin
- John Noble as Henry Parrish / Jeremy Crane
- Jill Marie Jones as Cynthia Irving
- Amandla Stenberg as Macey Irving
- Jahnee Wallace as Young Abigail Mills

=== Guest cast ===
- Michael Roark as Detective Devon Jones
- Patrick Gorman as Reverend Alfred Knapp
- David Fonteno as Reverend Boland
- Onira Tares as Grace Dixon
- Craig Trow as Lachlan Fredericks
- Braden Fitzgerald as Young Jeremy Crane
- Judd Lormand and Karen Beyer as Ancitif
- Laura Spencer as Caroline

== Episodes ==
| No. overall | No. in season | Title | Directed by | Written by | Original release date | Prod. code | US viewers (millions) |
|---|---|---|---|---|---|---|---|
| 1 | 1 | "Pilot" | Len Wiseman | Story by : Roberto Orci & Alex Kurtzman & Phillip Iscove & Len Wiseman; Teleplay by : Alex Kurtzman & Roberto Orci & Phillip Iscove | September 16, 2013 | 1AWL79 | 10.10 |
In the town of Sleepy Hollow in 1781, Ichabod Crane (Tom Mison) decapitates the Headless Horseman in battle, but is mortally wounded himself, and collapses. Both he and the Horseman awaken in 2013 in the same town. The latter kills the local sheriff, August Corbin (Clancy Brown), and Crane is mistakenly arrested for his murder by Corbin's partner, Lieutenant Abbie Mills (Nicole Beharie). Crane claims that he's innocent of the murder and has just risen after several centuries of entombment. Mills is inclined to believe Crane and together they learn that the Horseman is actually Death, one of the Four Horsemen, and is seeking his head to summon the others to bring about the Apocalypse. Mills and Crane recover the head before the Horseman does, thanks to a dream sent by Katrina Van Tassel (Katia Winter), executed centuries earlier for witchcraft. Crane and Mills also discover that Corbin had been keeping detailed files on the various mysteries of Sleepy Hollow.
| 2 | 2 | "Blood Moon" | Ken Olin | Roberto Orci & Alex Kurtzman & Mark Goffman | September 23, 2013 | 1AWL01 | 8.59 |
Mills' superior Frank Irving (Orlando Jones) reluctantly allows her to work with Crane due to the events occurring in Sleepy Hollow; the two begin using Corbin's gathered archives of occult material. Elsewhere, Andy Brooks (John Cho), a former fellow deputy who was killed in the previous episode assisting the Horseman, is reanimated and given new orders to resurrect the witch Serilda of Abaddon (Monique Ganderton). Serilda completes the ritual for her resurrection by hunting down and killing the descendants of the magistrate who burnt her for witchcraft centuries ago, but Crane and Mills destroy her with explosives. Mills has a dream/vision of Corbin, who tells her not to be afraid of '49' - the number of the room in the mental hospital in which her sister Jenny (Lyndie Greenwood) resides.
| 3 | 3 | "For the Triumph of Evil" | John F. Showalter | Story by : Phillip Iscove; Teleplay by : Jose Molina | September 30, 2013 | 1AWL02 | 7.97 |
A psychoanalyst connected to the Mills sisters mysteriously commits suicide and Crane and Abbie Mills visit Jenny at the institution. When others commit suicide as well, the Witnesses learn that the source of the mysterious deaths is the Mohawk dream spirit Ro'kenhronteys, or the Sandman. By entering the dream world of this spirit, they are able to resolve the problem and confront their past guilts and atone for them. When Mills goes to re-visit her sister, she learns that Jenny has escaped.
| 4 | 4 | "The Lesser Key of Solomon" | Paul Edwards | Damian Kindler | October 7, 2013 | 1AWL03 | 7.96 |
Mills and Crane search for Jenny, tracking her down to a cabin belonging to Corbin. Mills further learns that Corbin had Jenny track down rare and often magical objects, such as a sextant. This object reveals an old map of Sleepy Hollow marking the hidden location of The Lesser Key of Solomon, a book that can open a doorway to the seventh circle of Hell. A secret society of Hessians aligned with the Horseman get their hands on both the sextant and the book, but Mills destroys the book and ends the ritual. The Witnesses also learn that the demon responsible for resurrecting the Horseman is named Moloch.
| 5 | 5 | "John Doe" | Ernest Dickerson | Melissa Blake | October 14, 2013 | 1AWL04 | 7.59 |
A sickly boy suffering from an unknown disease is discovered in the woods and immediately put under CDC quarantine. Because the boy can only speak Middle English and says he is from Roanoke, Crane deduces that the child is from the lost Roanoke Colony. Investigating, the Witnesses discover that the colony was transported to an alternate dimension and the people within are suffering from - but not dying from - the same illness, originating from the second Horseman, Pestilence. The boy was lured out into the present to spread his disease, but Crane and Mills return him to his village, and the people both within and outside the village are cured.
| 6 | 6 | "The Sin Eater" | Ken Olin | Story by : Aaron Rahsaan Thomas; Teleplay by : Alex Kurtzman & Mark Goffman | November 4, 2013 | 1AWL05 | 7.08 |
Crane is kidnapped by Freemasons and, after confirming his identity, they ask him to take poison that will kill him as well as the Horseman (since their blood is linked occultly). Mills tracks down a sin eater named Henry Parrish (John Noble) so that Crane can be purged of his sins, and together they prepare for the Horseman's return that evening at nightfall.
| 7 | 7 | "The Midnight Ride" | Doug Aarniokoski | Heather V. Regnier | November 11, 2013 | 1AWL06 | 7.03 |
Crane discovers the Freemasons in Sleepy Hollow have been beheaded by the Horseman, and realizes that the creature is seeking its own head. Irving recovers the head from the lab (where it has stymied attempts to categorize it) before the Horseman comes for it, barely escaping with his life. Crane and Mills cannot destroy the head by normal means, so they use it to lure and trap the Horseman within a magical chamber built by Thomas Jefferson.
| 8 | 8 | "Necromancer" | Paul Edwards | Mark Goffman & Phillip Iscove | November 18, 2013 | 1AWL07 | 7.09 |
Mills and Crane interrogate the Horseman with Andy's help, despite the dead policeman's warnings not to do so. During the interrogation, the Horseman reveals himself to be Abraham Van Brunt, Katrina's former fiancé and Ichabod's friend who was killed by Hessians and turned into the Horseman by Moloch. Brooks, under Moloch's control, sneaks a druidic relic into the chamber where the Horseman is being held and uses it to free him. This allows Moloch's hellish minions to be summoned into the chamber, who escape with Brooks and the Horseman in tow.
| 9 | 9 | "Sanctuary" | Liz Friedlander | Damian Kindler & Chitra Elizabeth Sampath | November 25, 2013 | 1AWL08 | 6.56 |
Mills and Crane investigate the missing persons case of Lena Gilbert (Erin Cahill), the wealthy granddaughter of a mining and oil magnate. Lena went missing while visiting her family's country home, which was once owned by Lachlan, a friend of Ichabod's, who put a hex around the house as a protective spell. Crane takes an interest in the case because Lena circled a name, "Katrina C" (which he assumes is Katrina Crane) in a paper that she left behind. Lena explains that Katrina was the last person who took sanctuary in the house before it was sealed by Lachlan. Battling the evil spirits within the house, Lena, Crane, and Mills are able to escape. Mills has a vision of Katrina giving birth to a baby boy while taking sanctuary in the house, and Crane realizes that he has a son.
| 10 | 10 | "The Golem" | J. Miller Tobin | Story by : Alex Kurtzman; Teleplay by : Mark Goffman & Jose Molina | December 9, 2013 | 1AWL09 | 6.65 |
Ichabod and Abbie enlist the help of Henry Parrish to find information about Ichabod's son. Henry sends Ichabod to purgatory to confront Katrina's soul, learning that the boy's name is Jeremy. When Ichabod returns, he, Abbie, and Henry search to find the golem that was summoned by Jeremy centuries ago, and now seeks revenge on the coven that disowned his mother. After destroying the golem, the Witnesses receive a threatening message from Moloch.
| 11 | 11 | "The Vessel" | Romeo Tirone | Story by : Mark Goffman & David McMillan; Teleplay by : Melissa Blake | January 13, 2014 | 1AWL10 | 6.46 |
Ancitif, a minion of Moloch with the ability to jump from body to body and possess its victims via physical contact, returns to Sleepy Hollow after a seven year absence and delivers a foreboding warning to Captain Irving: unless he delivers George Washington’s Bible – a valuable resource in the war against Moloch - great harm will befall his disabled daughter, Macey.
| 12 | 12 | "The Indispensable Man" | Adam Kane | Story by : Sam Chalsen; Teleplay by : Damian Kindler & Heather V. Regnier | January 20, 2014 | 1AWL11 | 6.82 |
Ichabod and Abbie, while studying George Washington's Bible, learn of a map of purgatory that was created after Washington's death and was likely buried along with his body in a secret location. They enlist the help of Henry Parrish in locating Washington's burial site. Meanwhile, Andy, after failing to persuade Abbie to give him the map, is granted demonic powers by Moloch. Inside Washington's tomb, Ichabod, Abbie, and Henry locate the map, but are then ambushed by Andy. Only Ichabod's quick thinking allows them to seal him away and retrieve it. After an argument with Abbie over whether or not to use the map to free Katrina, Ichabod burns it. Meanwhile, Irving, seemingly unable to explain how two men and a priest were killed while fighting a possessed Macey, confesses to the murders to protect her.
| 13 | 13 | "Bad Blood" | Ken Olin | Alex Kurtzman & Mark Goffman | January 20, 2014 | 1AWL12 | 7.05 |
Ichabod and Abbie travel to purgatory to enlist the help of Katrina when they learn from Henry Parrish that the third horseman, War, will appear in the real world during a forthcoming eclipse. When they arrive, Abbie and Ichabod are separated and placed in illusionary worlds where they are not Witnesses. When they both come to realize that what they are seeing is not real, they reunite and travel to an old church to find Katrina. There, Abbie and Ichabod learn from Katrina that she is unable to leave unless someone were to take her place, to which Abbie agrees. When Ichabod and Katrina return to the real world, they set up a ritual to prevent War from being summoned. When their efforts aren't successful, Henry appears and restrains them. He explains that he is Jeremy, having been resurrected by Moloch thirteen years ago, which Jenny and Abbie witnessed. Assuming the mantle of War, he brings forth the Horseman and rewards him for his service with Katrina. As Abbie regains her memories of Moloch, Crane is buried alive by Jeremy, who then breaks the second seal that separates Hell and Earth.

== Ratings ==
| No. in series | No. in season | Title | Original air date | Time slot (EST) | U.S. Rating/share (18–49) | Viewers (millions) | DVR (18–49) | DVR viewers (millions) | DVR Total (18–49) | Total viewers (millions) |
|---|---|---|---|---|---|---|---|---|---|---|
| 1 | 1 | "Pilot" | September 16, 2013 | Monday; 9:00 p.m. | 3.5/9 | 10.10 | 2.3 | 5.27 | 5.8 | 15.37 |
| 2 | 2 | "Blood Moon" | September 23, 2013 | Monday; 9:00 p.m. | 3.1/8 | 8.59 | 2.2 | 4.96 | 5.3 | 13.54 |
| 3 | 3 | "For the Triumph of Evil" | September 30, 2013 | Monday; 9:00 p.m. | 3.0/8 | 7.97 | 2.1 | 4.83 | 5.1 | 12.79 |
| 4 | 4 | "The Lesser Key of Solomon" | October 7, 2013 | Monday; 9:00 p.m. | 2.8/7 | 7.96 | 1.9 | 4.29 | 4.7 | 12.25 |
| 5 | 5 | "John Doe" | October 14, 2013 | Monday; 9:00 p.m. | 2.7/7 | 7.59 | 1.7 | 4.02 | 4.4 | 11.61 |
| 6 | 6 | "The Sin Eater" | November 4, 2013 | Monday; 9:00 p.m. | 2.5/6 | 7.08 | 1.8 | 4.13 | 4.3 | 11.21 |
| 7 | 7 | "The Midnight Ride" | November 11, 2013 | Monday; 9:00 p.m. | 2.6/7 | 7.03 | 1.6 | 3.67 | 4.2 | 10.70 |
| 8 | 8 | "Necromancer" | November 18, 2013 | Monday; 9:00 p.m. | 2.5/6 | 7.09 | 1.5 | 3.56 | 4.0 | 10.65 |
| 9 | 9 | "Sanctuary" | November 25, 2013 | Monday; 9:00 p.m. | 2.2/6 | 6.56 | 1.4 | 3.45 | 3.6 | 10.01 |
| 10 | 10 | "The Golem" | December 9, 2013 | Monday; 9:00 p.m. | 2.2/6 | 6.65 | 1.5 | 3.55 | 3.7 | 10.20 |
| 11 | 11 | "The Vessel" | January 13, 2014 | Monday; 9:00 p.m. | 2.2/6 | 6.46 | 1.3 | 3.17 | 3.5 | 9.63 |
| 12 | 12 | "The Indispensable Man" | January 20, 2014 | Monday; 8:00 p.m. | 2.2/6 | 6.82 | 1.3 | 3.05 | 3.7 | 10.10 |
| 13 | 13 | "Bad Blood" | January 20, 2014 | Monday; 9:00 p.m. | 2.4/6 | 7.05 | 1.3 | 3.05 | 3.7 | 10.10 |
