= Sleepy Hollow season 2 =

Season of television series

Sleepy Hollow
- Season 2
- Season 2 DVD cover
- No. of episodes: 18

Release
- Original network: Fox
- Original release: September 22, 2014 – February 23, 2015

Season chronology
- ← Previous; Season 1 Next → Season 3

The second season of the Fox television series Sleepy Hollow premiered on September 22, 2014, and concluded February 23, 2015, consisting of 18 episodes.

== Cast and characters ==
=== Main cast ===
- Tom Mison as Ichabod Crane
- Nicole Beharie as Lt. Abigail "Abbie" Mills
- Orlando Jones as Frank Irving
- Katia Winter as Katrina Crane
- Lyndie Greenwood as Jennifer "Jenny" Mills
- John Noble as Henry Parish / Jeremy Crane

=== Recurring cast ===
- Neil Jackson, Jeremy Owens, and Craig Branham as the Headless Horseman / Abraham Van Brunt
- Matt Barr as Nick Hawley
- Derek Mears, Marti Matulis, Luke Smith, and Austin Filson as Moloch
- Sakina Jaffrey as Sheriff Leena Reyes
- Marti Matulis, Eric Marinade, and Ed Dabney as the Horseman of War

=== Guest cast ===
- Timothy Busfield as Benjamin Franklin
- Jill Marie Jones as Cynthia Irving
- Patrick Gorman as Reverend Alfred Knapp
- John Cho as Officer Andy Brooks
- Clancy Brown as Sheriff August Corbin
- Onira Tares as Grace Dixon
- Aunjanue Ellis as Lori Mills
- Laura Spencer as Caroline
- Sharif Atkins as Calvin Riggs
- Johnathon Schaech as Solomon Kent
- Zach Appelman as Joe Corbin
- Heather Lind as Mary Wells
- Francie Swift as Beth Lancaster
- Max Brown as Orion
- Jaime Murray as Carmilla Pines
- Steven Weber as Thomas Jefferson
- Michelle Trachtenberg as Abigail Adams
- Eddie Spears as Big Ash
- Cynthia Stevenson as Nurse Gina Lambert
- Chris Greene as Daniel Riggs
- Braden Fitzgerald as Young Jeremy Crane

== Episodes ==
No. overall	No. in season	Title	Directed by	Written by	Original release date	Prod. code	US viewers (millions)
14	1	"This Is War"	Ken Olin	Mark Goffman	September 22, 2014	2AWL01	5.51
Betrayed by his son, Ichabod vows to rescue Abbie, who remains trapped in purgatory. Meanwhile, Henry tracks down Jenny and uses his powers to consume her sins, obtaining a lead to a portion of Benjamin Franklin's (Timothy Busfield) sketchbook. Abbie encounters Andy's condemned soul, which guides her to a magic mirror that she uses to warn Ichabod of Henry's plans. Ichabod escapes from his coffin using improvised explosives, and helps Jenny escape from Henry's thugs. They decode a hidden message in the sketchbook, which contains the location of a key that can bridge purgatory and the real world. Entering Moloch's realm, Ichabod encounters a doppelgänger of himself, whom Abbie beheads. Escaping purgatory, they prevent Moloch from following them by allowing the key to naturally disintegrate. Moloch contacts Henry and provides him with a weapon: an enchanted suit of armor wielding a flaming sword that only he can control.
15	2	"The Kindred"	Paul Edwards	Mark Goffman & Albert Kim	September 29, 2014	2AWL02	5.04
Ichabod and Abbie learn of the "Kindred", a Frankenstein-esque monster created by Benjamin Franklin using the remains of fallen soldiers, which he eventually abandoned after failing to acquire the means necessary to give it life. Eager to rescue his wife, Ichabod persuades Abbie to help him acquire the Horseman's head. Abbie visits Irving in jail, learning that the head is kept in a secure safe deposit box. She also arranges for him to be transferred to the psych ward so that he can assist them more easily. Using the head, Ichabod revives the Kindred and sends it to distract Henry and the Horseman while he meets with Katrina, who convinces him to let her stay so she can spy on them. The Kindred, meanwhile, mysteriously disappears after the battle and cannot be found. Jenny, having been arrested for possession of illegal weapons, remains in custody while Abbie works to persuade the new sheriff to release her. Posing as a lawyer, Henry visits Irving and offers his services. While signing the contract, Irving cuts his finger and signs it in blood.
16	3	"Root of All Evil"	Jeffrey Hunt	Melissa Blake & Donald Todd	October 6, 2014	2AWL04	4.46
While visiting Irving, Ichabod and Abbie learn that Henry, in his capacity as Irving's lawyer, has banned them from seeing him. Jenny is freed after Abbie gets the sheriff to reduce her sentence to community service, and the two sisters argue about trust and their complicated past. Ichabod and Abbie learn that Henry has brought a cursed coin that corrupts its owner (which is what caused Benedict Arnold to turn against Washington) to Sleepy Hollow. After several murders, the coin is taken into police custody, where Henry swipes it and gives it to Jenny, driving her to seek the death of the new sheriff out of revenge for her mother (who died in the same asylum where Jenny was imprisoned). Abbie and Ichabod, with the help of Jenny's old friend Nick Hawley, are able to talk her out of it, and seal the coin in a piece of sanctified glass. Enraged, Henry returns to his childhood home and burns the bed where he was born.
17	4	"Go Where I Send Thee..."	Doug Aarniokoski	Damian Kindler	October 13, 2014	2AWL03	4.76
When 10-year old Sarah Lancaster is abducted by a demonic pied piper, Ichabod and Abbie discover a bone flute in the woods while searching for the girl, which puts Abbie into a trance when Ichabod plays it. They convince Nick to help them search for the girl in exchange for the flute. After tracking her down, Ichabod and Abbie unchain her while Nick distracts the piper and sets charges to slow him down. He then demands the flute, but Abbie breaks it instead. Irving tries to nullify his contract with Henry, but learns that the latter now controls his soul. Sarah is returned to her parents, but her mother subsequently tries to sacrifice her to the piper in order to break her family's curse. Ichabod and Abbie team up to destroy the piper and save Sarah. Nick unknowingly sells the broken flute to Henry, who grinds it into dust for a ritual.
18	5	"The Weeping Lady"	Larry Teng	M. Raven Metzner	October 20, 2014	2AWL05	5.02
Katrina draws the Horseman's suspicions when she reaches out to Ichabod with a letter carried by a bird. Meanwhile, Ichabod and Abbie investigate the death of a woman who appears to have drowned in her house. Ichabod identifies the culprit as "The Weeping Lady", the ghost of a woman who accidentally drowned centuries earlier. After the Lady attacks Abbie in a library and nearly kills her, Ichabod realizes that she is actually Mary Wells, who was once betrothed to him. After he chose Katrina, she sent him a letter explaining her decision to return to England. Suspecting that she will go after Katrina next, Ichabod and Abbie help the latter perform a ritual to return Mary to the afterlife. Katrina admits that she faked the letter to cover up Mary's death, straining her relationship with Ichabod. Meanwhile, an angry Moloch informs Henry that he must bring him Katrina so that he can use her magic to restore his physical body.
19	6	"And the Abyss Gazes Back"	Doug Aarniokoski	Heather V. Regnier	October 27, 2014	2AWL06	4.62
Abbie learns that August Corbin's son Joe has returned to town after being honorably discharged from military service. As he still blames her for his father's death, however, he refuses to see her. While responding to reports of loud noise, they discover Joe surrounded by dozens of corpses. Ichabod suspects that Joe is a wendigo, a monster who feeds on human organs when it smells blood. After witnessing him transform again, they feed him to reverse the transformation. Henry reveals that he placed a curse on Joe using a letter, and that he is willing to exchange the cure for a specific poison. Joe complies, but Henry exposes him to blood, turning him again before Ichabod uses a Shawnee incantation to drive the wendigo's spirit from his body. Irving learns that the only way to break the contract is to murder the man responsible for crippling Macey, which he almost does when the man shows no remorse. However, he realises that the killing would be part of Moloch's plan, and cannot complete the deed. Henry visits Katrina and administers the poison in the form of a spider by forcing her to eat it.
20	7	"Deliverance"	Nick Copus	Sam Chalsen & Nelson Greaves	November 3, 2014	2AWL07	4.52
Katrina falls ill, and blames Henry for poisoning her. Turning him and the Horseman against each other, she escapes and collapses in the woods, and is eventually brought to the hospital. Abbie and Ichabod manage to extract her before Henry's men can, and they study her condition. Henry is revealed to be in league with the Hellfire Club, a sect of Moloch worshippers, and Katrina's "illness" turns out to be the early stages of pregnancy. Ichabod blames the Horseman, but Katrina defends him. Henry's men raid the archives, and they retreat to the church. Despite Henry's actions, Katrina remains convinced that he will save her, as he is still her son. Ichabod confronts Henry at the asylum, learning that the baby is in fact Moloch himself. After learning that the concentrated light of the aurora borealis can exorcise Moloch, Ichabod and Abbie use an enchanted prism stolen from the Club to destroy the poison.
21	8	"Heartless"	David Boyd	Albert Kim	November 10, 2014	2AWL08	4.65
To gather souls for resurrecting Moloch, Henry summons a succubus. Ichabod explains that a succubus preys on those who desire love, usually lonely men. With Katrina's help, they prevent the succubus from stealing Nick's soul, but it escapes. Katrina experiences strange visions, which Ichabod believes to be the lingering effects of the poison. By exploring them further, Katrina discovers Henry's plan. She also learns that the succubus is in fact the Incordata, a demon that feeds on lust to sustain the loss of its heart. Katrina and Abbie find and destroy the heart, allowing Ichabod and Nick to kill the Incordata. As she now has a spiritual connection to Moloch, Katrina persuades Ichabod to let her return to Henry, who has already gathered enough souls to resurrect Moloch as an infant.
22	9	"Mama"	Wendey Stanzler	Damian Kindler	November 17, 2014	2AWL09	4.68
Abbie and Jenny investigate several suicides at the asylum, which brings up painful memories of the death of their mother, Lori (Aunjanue Ellis). Abbie tries to get Irving to help, but he refuses. While reviewing security footage, they are shocked to discover their mother's spirit visiting each of the victims prior to their deaths. With Nick's help, they prevent another suicide from occurring, but Abbie soon vanishes, leaving Jenny with a secret message: 'TPRJLMIL'. Jenny uses the message to find Lori's taped sessions, during which she names Lambert (Cynthia Stevenson), her abusive nurse, as an angel of mercy. The sisters reunite and return to the asylum in time to prevent Lambert from killing Irving. Lambert then tries to kill Abbie, before Jenny uses a spell from Lori's journal to destroy her. They then summon Lori's spirit, learning that before her death, she uncovered a weapon that could defeat Moloch. After saying their goodbyes, they leave, joined by Irving.
23	10	"Magnum Opus"	Doug Aarniokoski	Donald Todd	November 24, 2014	2AWL10	4.28
Researching the journal for any clues about Lori's weapon, Abbie and Ichabod discover a hidden message that connects to Hebrew lore; it tells of the "Sword of Methuselah", which they believe to be the weapon. Realizing the connection between Franklin's Join, or Die cartoon and Sleepy Hollow's rivers, they attempt to track down the sword. Henry dispatches the Horseman to stop them, but he is forced to retreat at sunrise. Ichabod and Abbie discover a hidden underground lair, which is filled with statues, one of whom Abbie recognizes; Ichabod realizes that a gorgon guards the sword. They manage to trick the Horseman into slaying the gorgon (since he is immune to its curse), but he is soon recalled by Henry, signaling the beginning of the Apocalypse. Ichabod and Abbie find the sword hidden by oil, and are able to obtain it by starting a fire. Elsewhere, Henry and the Horseman prepare to welcome Moloch's arrival.
24	11	"The Akeda"	Dwight Little	Mark Goffman	December 1, 2014	2AWL11	4.51
Ichabod and Abbie journey to Henry's manor, where they find the Horseman using a spell to bind Katrina to himself. Ichabod engages and defeats him, but is unable to finish him off due to the Sword requiring his soul in order to take a life. As Irving is the only member of the group without a soul, Jenny tasks him with wielding the blade. Moloch begins burning the four trees that prevent Hell from merging with the real world, summoning an army of demons to serve him. Abbie is severely wounded, while Irving sacrifices himself to destroy the Horseman of War. Abbie vows to avenge him, while Moloch orders Henry to recover the sword at all costs. Even without his armor, he overpowers the entire group and seizes the sword. Moloch orders him to kill Katrina, but he sacrifices himself instead to destroy the former.
25	12	"Paradise Lost"	Russell Fine	M. Raven Metzner	January 5, 2015	2AWL12	4.48
Two months after Moloch's defeat, Ichabod and Abbie continue to investigate supernatural occurrences. While investigating blighted crops, they encounter an angel named Orion (Max Brown), who has been freed from purgatory after being trapped there for 200 years during a battle with the Horseman of Death. As he offers to destroy the Headless Horseman for good, Abbie sees him as the solution to their greatest problem, however, Katrina, who wishes to separate the Horseman from Abraham, warns him of their plan. With Nick's help, Abbie and Orion locate the Horseman, during which Orion reveals his intentions to steal the power of Death for the angels. Ichabod interferes and breaks his sword with the Horseman's axe, driving him off. Katrina persuades Abraham to give up his vendetta against Ichabod so that she can make him human again.
26	13	"Pittura Infamante"	John Leonetti	Melissa Blake	January 19, 2015	2AWL13	4.19
Ichabod and Katrina attempt to reconcile their marriage, but are faced with a murder investigation when the body of an art restorer is found in the hanged man position. Katrina remembers her friend Abigail Adams (Michelle Trachtenberg) speaking of similar murders in 1781, and of how they remain unresolved despite her best efforts. They learn that the murderer is a man called James Colby, an artist and serial killer who was only stopped when Abigail used herself as bait to imprison him inside his final, unfinished painting. Ichabod and Katrina enter the painting and free the missing man, but also give Colby an opening to complete his painting and escape. Abbie destroys the painting, erasing Colby's soul from existence. Irving is mysteriously resurrected without his memories, which they initially try to hide from his family. Abbie, however, eventually reveals the truth to his wife.
27	14	"Kali Yuga"	Doug Aarniokoski	Story by : Heather V. Regnier; Teleplay by : Sam Chalsen & Nelson Greaves	January 26, 2015	2AWL14	4.37
Carmilla Pines (Jaime Murray), a ruthless treasure hunter and Nick's adopted mother, arrives in town with a terrible story: a Hindu cult captured her and used a ritual to turn her into a vetala, a being that inhabits the bodies of the dead. Appealing to his empathy, she asks him to help her reverse the ritual using an enchanted statue of Kali which once belonged to Henry Knox. However, she soon reveals that the statue also has the power to create more vetalas, and tries to turn Nick into one. After Ichabod, Abbie, and Jenny drive her off, Nick leaves town so he can find and destroy her. Meanwhile, an appeals court clears Irving of all charges, but it is unclear how he will be able to resume a normal life.
28	15	"Spellcaster"	Paul Edwards	Albert Kim	February 2, 2015	2AWL15	4.38
Ichabod and Abbie learn that a powerful warlock who oversaw the Salem witch trials has escaped from purgatory and is attempting to change the past using the Grand Grimoire. Katrina reveals that the man's hatred of witches stems from a failed love affair with one, and that she and her coven were able to banish him using their combined power. They confront the warlock, but he overpowers them and escapes. Katrina unexpectedly leaves the case to Ichabod and Abbie, forcing them to turn to Irving. Using electricity (as warlocks are weak to the elements), they weaken him, but he escapes once again. During an ensuing manhunt, Irving finds the man and kills him, before giving the Grimoire to Henry. Katrina becomes increasingly obsessed with black magic, which she witnessed the warlock using earlier.
29	16	"What Lies Beneath"	Dwight Little	Story by : Damian Kindler & Phillip Iscove; Teleplay by : Damian Kindler	February 9, 2015	2AWL16	3.87
Ichabod and Abbie investigate the disappearance of three town workers and learn that they were abducted by the Reavers, immortal demonic entities that were summoned by Thomas Jefferson to guard his secret vault, the Fenestella (after the Roman historian). After an initial venture into the sewer fails, the two decide to acquire more firepower before returning. Meanwhile, Irving and Jenny break into the sheriff's evidence lockup, where Irving takes items recovered from the Hellfire Club. When confronted, he reveals that Henry still controls him and that he has been working on a plan to defeat him. Reaching the Fenestella, Ichabod and Abbie encounter a holographic recording of Thomas Jefferson (Steven Weber), who reveals that the Fenestella was built to aid the Witnesses. However, they decide to sacrifice it in order to save the men. Ichabod persuades Jefferson to destroy the power source feeding the Fenestella, causing Jefferson and the Reavers to vanish. Meanwhile, Henry appears to Katrina in a dream, but Katrina wonders if it really happened.
30	17	"Awakening"	Doug Aarniokoski	M. Raven Metzner	February 16, 2015	2AWL17	4.47
Henry attempts to use a copy of the Liberty Bell to try and reawaken the ancient witches of Sleepy Hollow. Lacking enough power, he has Katrina finish the ritual. Ichabod and Abbie stop him, but Henry is killed in the process. Enraged by Ichabod's "betrayal," Katrina sends herself to the past in order to prevent his resurrection. Abbie follows her to 1781, where Katrina has assumed control of her past self. Abbie is soon arrested by soldiers who mistake her for a runaway slave, and she subsequently demands to speak with their superior, Captain Ichabod Crane.
31	18	"Tempus Fugit"	Paul Edwards	Mark Goffman	February 23, 2015	2AWL18	4.35
Abbie persuades Crane to trust her by revealing details of their future lives, including Crane's encounter with the Headless Horsemen. As Ichabod was not killed by the Horseman due to visiting Abbie, the two see his mentor, Benjamin Franklin, for help. Katrina manipulates the Horseman into pursuing them and Franklin is beheaded. Crane becomes convinced Abbie is a spy, but she shows him a recording he made on her phone, which restores his trust in her. They then meet with Grace Dixon, Abbie's ancestor, a powerful witch herself. Explaining their journey is far from complete, Grace reverses the spell back to the exact moment of Abbie and Katrina's disappearance. Crane fatally stabs Katrina when she tries to kill Abbie in revenge. Jenny arrives with Irving, who has been freed from his contract. Abbie informs them the battle for the fate of the world is not yet over.

== Ratings ==
No. in series	No. in season	Title	Original air date	Time slot (EST)	U.S. Rating/share (18–49)	Viewers (millions)	DVR (18–49)	DVR viewers (millions)	DVR Total (18–49)	Total viewers (millions)
14	1	"This Is War"	September 22, 2014	Monday; 9:00 p.m.	2.0/5	5.51	1.5	3.43	3.5	9.02
15	2	"The Kindred"	September 29, 2014	Monday; 9:00 p.m.	1.7/5	5.04	1.3	2.87	3.0	7.93
16	3	"Root of All Evil"	October 6, 2014	Monday; 9:00 p.m.	1.7/5	4.46	1.1	2.83	2.8	7.30
17	4	"Go Where I Send Thee..."	October 13, 2014	Monday; 9:00 p.m.	1.7/5	4.76	1.0	—N/a	2.7	—N/a
18	5	"The Weeping Lady"	October 20, 2014	Monday; 9:00 p.m.	1.8/5	5.02	1.1	2.83	2.9	7.85
19	6	"And the Abyss Gazes Back"	October 27, 2014	Monday; 9:00 p.m.	1.6/4	4.62	1.1	2.65	2.7	7.27
20	7	"Deliverance"	November 3, 2014	Monday; 9:00 p.m.	1.5/4	4.52	1.1	2.76	2.6	7.28
21	8	"Heartless"	November 10, 2014	Monday; 9:00 p.m.	1.5/4	4.65	1.1	—N/a	2.6	—N/a
22	9	"Mama"	November 17, 2014	Monday; 9:00 p.m.	1.6/4	4.68	1.0	—N/a	2.6	—N/a
23	10	"Magnum Opus"	November 24, 2014	Monday; 9:00 p.m.	1.4/4	4.28	0.7	—N/a	2.1	—N/a
24	11	"The Akeda"	December 1, 2014	Monday; 9:00 p.m.	1.5/4	4.51	0.9	2.38	2.4	6.88
25	12	"Paradise Lost"	January 5, 2015	Monday; 9:00 p.m.	1.6/4	4.48	1.0	2.58	2.6	7.06
26	13	"Pittura Infamante"	January 19, 2015	Monday; 9:00 p.m.	1.3/4	4.19	1.1	2.83	2.4	7.02
27	14	"Kali Yuga"	January 26, 2015	Monday; 9:00 p.m.	1.5/4	4.37	0.8	2.32	2.3	6.69
28	15	"Spellcaster"	February 2, 2015	Monday; 9:00 p.m.	1.4/4	4.38	0.9	—N/a	2.3	—N/a
29	16	"What Lies Beneath"	February 9, 2015	Monday; 9:00 p.m.	1.2/3	3.87	0.9	—N/a	2.1	—N/a
30	17	"Awakening"	February 16, 2015	Monday; 9:00 p.m.	1.4/4	4.47	0.8	—N/a	2.2	—N/a
31	18	"Tempus Fugit"	February 23, 2015	Monday; 9:00 p.m.	1.4/4	4.35	1.0	—N/a	2.4	—N/a
