= Good Cops =

American action comedy web series

- Genre: Action comedy
- Created by: Jacob Givens; Derek Haugen
- Written by: Jacob Givens; Derek Haugen; Noel Carroll
- Directed by: Clayton Cogswell
- Starring: Jacob Givens; Derek Haugen; Noel Carroll
- Theme music composer: Tim Sloan
- Composer: Tim Sloan
- Country of origin: United States
- Original language: English
- No. of seasons: 2
- No. of episodes: 22

Production
- Editor: Clayton Cogswell
- Running time: 2–16 minutes
- Production company: Good Cops Entertainment

Original release
- Network: YouTube
- Release: October 19, 2011 – February 13, 2012
- Network: Machinima
- Release: December 11, 2012 – January 22, 2013

Good Cops is American action comedy web series created by Jacob Givens and Derek Haugen, series debuted on YouTube, until second season was picked up by Machinima.

== Episodes ==
Season	Episodes	Originally released		
Season	Episodes	First released	Last released	Network
1	8	October 19, 2011	February 13, 2012	YouTube
2	13	December 11, 2012	January 22, 2013	Machinima

=== Season 1 (2011–2012) ===
No. overall	No. in season	Title	Original release date
1	1	"Undercover"	October 19, 2011
2	2	"The Night Flasher"	October 26, 2011
3	3	"Flashback"	November 10, 2011
4	4	"Desert Highball"	November 17, 2011
5	5	"The Human Hourglass"	December 7, 2011
6	6	"Wire Tap Commandos"	December 23, 2011
7	7	"The Sunrise Danger"	January 11, 2012
8	8	"A Threesome of Justice"	February 13, 2012

=== Season 2 (2012–2013) ===
No. overall	No. in season	Title	Original release date
9	1	"Anonymous Tip"	December 11, 2012
10	2	"Russian Water Trick"	December 14, 2012
11	3	"Infiltration"	December 18, 2012
12	4	"Daytime Blowout"	December 21, 2012
13	5	"In Deep"	December 26, 2012
14	6	"Breakout"	December 28, 2012
15	7	"Prohibition"	January 1, 2013
16	8	"Intercession"	January 4, 2013
17	9	"Devil Root"	January 8, 2013
18	10	"Imposture"	January 11, 2013
19	11	"To Finger A Man"	January 15, 2013
20	12	"One Shot, One Kill"	January 18, 2013
21	13	"When Light Breaks the Shade"	January 22, 2013

=== Special (2019) ===
No. overall	No. in season	Title	Original release date
22	1	"A Halloween Tales"	October 31, 2019
