= Prank Lab =

American hidddn-camara reality web series

- Created by: Sean Durrie; Tony Janning
- Presented by: Sean Durrie; Tony Janning
- Country of origin: United States
- Original language: English
- No. of episodes: 31

Production
- Executive producers: Ashton Kutcher; Jason Goldberg; Anthony Britt
- Running time: 3–5 minutes
- Production company: Katalyst Media

Original release
- Network: Machinima
- Release: August 1, 2012 – May 27, 2013

Prank Lab is an American hidden camera practical joke reality web series produced by Katalyst Media, the series premiered on Machinima in 2012.

== Episodes ==
No.	Title	Original release date
1	"Craigslist Test Drive"	August 1, 2012
2	"Line Cutter"	August 1, 2012
3	"Cop Pullover"	August 7, 2012
4	"Pranking Comic Con"	August 14, 2012
5	"Buttman & Throbbin"	August 20, 2012
6	"Stoner Valet"	August 21, 2012
7	"Won't You Be My Neighbor?"	August 28, 2012
8	"World's Biggest Rubber Band Hit"	September 4, 2012
9	"Fruit Ninjas"	September 11, 2012
10	"Ticket Dick"	September 18, 2012
