= Orlando Jones =

American actor (born 1968)

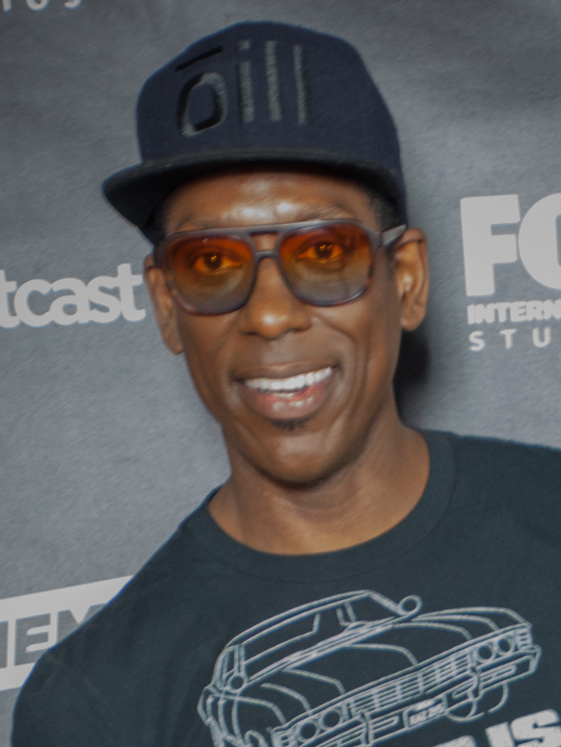
- Jones in 2015
- Born: April 10, 1968 (age 58); Mobile, Alabama, U.S.
- Spouse: Jacqueline Staph (m. 2009)
- Children: 2

Comedy career
- Years active: 1987–present
- Medium: Character actor, sketch comedy
- Genres: Film, television, stand-up
- Website: www.orlandojones.com

Orlando Jones (born April 10, 1968) is an American stand-up comedian and actor. He is known for being one of the original cast members of the sketch comedy series MADtv, for his role as the 7 Up spokesman from 1999 to 2002, and for his role as the African god Anansi on Starz's American Gods.

== Early life ==
Jones was born in Mobile, Alabama, in 1968. His father was a professional baseball player in the Philadelphia Phillies organization. He moved to Mauldin, South Carolina, when he was a teen and graduated from Mauldin High School in 1985. One of his early acting experiences involved playing a werewolf in a haunted house to help raise money for the junior/senior prom. Jones enrolled in the College of Charleston, South Carolina. He left in 1990 without finishing his degree.

To pursue his interest in the entertainment industry, Jones, together with comedian Michael Fechter, formed a production company, Homeboy's Productions and Advertising. Together Jones and Fechter worked on several projects including a McDonald's commercial with basketball superstar Michael Jordan for the McDonald's specialty sandwich the "McJordan".

He scored his first Hollywood job in 1987, writing for the NBC comedy A Different World, on which he had a small guest role in the season five finale. During 1991–92, Jones penned the Fox series Roc and, in 1993, he co-produced The Sinbad Show. He also made a brief appearance on the FOX sitcom Herman's Head in 1992.

== Career ==
=== MADtv ===
After hosting Fox's music series Sound FX, in 1994, Jones became one of the original nine cast members of MADtv. Unlike some of his fellow original repertory performers on MADtv, Jones came to the show with limited sketch comedy experience.

Throughout the first two seasons of MADtv, Jones performed as characters like the Cabana Chat band leader Dexter St. Croix and Reverend LaMont Nixon Fatback, the vocal follower of Christopher Walken. He was also noted for his impressions of Thomas Mikal Ford, Temuera Morrison, Warwick Davis, Danny DeVito, Michael Jai White, Eddie Griffin, and Ice Cube.

After two seasons on MADtv, Jones left the show to pursue a movie career. However, Jones returned to MADtv in 2004 to celebrate its 200th episode.

=== Other television projects ===
Aside from MADtv, Jones made many other television appearances. Perhaps his most popular and enduring television appearance was in a series of humorous commercials as the spokesperson for 7 Up where he gained wide recognition. Notably, one commercial had him wear a t-shirt that had 7 Up's then-slogan Make 7 Up Yours divided between the front and back with the double entendre on the back that featured the Up Yours part; 7 Up would sell the shirt through specialty retailer Spencer Gifts for many years.

This exposure led to a plethora of opportunities for Jones. First, he hosted an HBO First Look special in 2000 and then, in 2003, was given his own late night talk show on FX called The Orlando Jones Show. Although his talk show was short lived, Jones continued to make additional television appearances. In 2003, he appeared on The Bernie Mac Show and on Girlfriends. In 2006, Jones decided to return to television as one of the lead characters of ABC's crime drama The Evidence, as Cayman Bishop. He has also appeared in two episodes of Everybody Hates Chris, the first in 2007 as Chris's substitute teacher and the second in 2008 as Clint Huckstable, an allusion to the character Cliff Huxtable played by Bill Cosby on The Cosby Show.

In 2008, he appeared as Harold Wilcox, a violent veteran with PTSD, on New Amsterdam. In the first season of the show, Jones also starred on Wild 'N Out. Jones was the first guest star on the show. Jones was the co-host of ABC's Crash Course (which was canceled after 4 episodes). On November 16, 2009, it was announced in TV Guide that Jones had been cast as Marcus Foreman, Eric Foreman's brother on House, appearing in the season six episode "Moving the Chains". In 2013, he was hired as a principal actor in the FOX television series Sleepy Hollow. The freshman drama opened to FOX's highest fall drama premiere numbers since the premiere of 24 in 2001.

From 2016 through 2019, Jones portrayed Mr. Nancy, aka the African god Anansi, in the Starz series American Gods.

=== Film projects ===
After leaving MADtv, Jones expanded his cinema resume. He appeared in a bit part in his first big screen film, In Harm's Way (1997), then joined Larry David in the feature Sour Grapes (1998), playing the character of an itinerant man. Subsequently, he appeared in Woo (1998), Mike Judge's Office Space (1999), alongside fellow MADtv alumnus David Herman, and in Barry Levinson's praised drama, Liberty Heights (1999). Since then, Jones has appeared in Magnolia (1999), New Jersey Turnpikes (1999) and in Harold Ramis' Bedazzled (2000).

During the 2000s, Jones' career began to branch out. In addition to his appearances in the 7 Up campaigns, Jones played the role of Clifford Franklin in The Replacements (2000) and the horror film From Dusk till Dawn 3: The Hangman's Daughter (2003). In 2002, Jones landed the lead role of Daryl Chase in the action-dramedy Double Take (2001), alongside Eddie Griffin, and worked with David Duchovny, Seann William Scott and Julianne Moore in Ivan Reitman's sci-fi comedy, Evolution (2001). Jones was also in the 2009 film Cirque du Freak: The Vampire's Assistant and he appeared as the computer Vox 114 in The Time Machine (2002). His other more recent films includes Drumline (2002), Biker Boyz (2003), Runaway Jury (2003) and Primeval (2007). Jones appeared in an uncredited cameo and played in Grindhouse Planet Terror (2007).

In 2011, Jones appeared in the documentary film Looking for Lenny, in which he talks about Lenny Bruce and freedom of speech. In 2012, Jones starred in Joe Penna's original interactive thriller series Meridian created in conjunction with Fourth Wall Studios.

In April 2013, Jones reported that he would be taking Tyler Perry's place as Madea, and posted a photograph of himself impersonating the character, causing some outcry among Madea fans. However, this was later revealed to be a prank played by Jones; Perry stated "That was an April Fools' joke that HE did. Not true. And not funny. When I'm done with Madea, she is done."

=== Voice acting ===
Jones has been featured in many voice acting projects over the years. In 1993, he appeared in Yuletide in the 'hood and in 1998, he made a guest appearance in the animated comedy TV series, King of the Hill. He then lent his voice to two more animated TV series, Father of the Pride and Yin Yang Yo!, as well as the video games Halo 2 (where he voiced Marine Sergeant Banks and other black marines) and L.A. Rush. In 2006, he co-created, produced and voice acted for the MTV2 animated series The Adventures of Chico and Guapo.

== Personal life ==
Jones married former model Jacqueline Staph in 2009. They have a daughter.

In October 2011, Jones provoked controversy when he joked on Twitter that someone should kill former Governor of Alaska and vice presidential candidate Sarah Palin. He apologized for the comment several days later.

== Filmography ==
=== Film ===
Year	Title	Role	Notes
1997	In Harm's Way	Andre	Short film
1998	Sour Grapes	Digby	
1998	Woo	Sticky Fingas	
1999	Office Space	Steve	
1999	From Dusk Till Dawn 3: The Hangman's Daughter	Ezra Traylor	Direct-to-video
1999	Liberty Heights	Little Melvin	
1999	Magnolia	Worm	
1999	New Jersey Turnpikes		
2000	Waterproof	Natty Battle	
2000	The Replacements	Clifford Franklin	
2000	Chain of Fools	Miss Cocoa	
2000	Bedazzled	Various	
2001	Double Take	Daryl Chase	
2001	Say It Isn't So	Dig McCaffrey	
2001	Evolution	Professor Harry Block	
2001	Unbakeable	Elijah Price	Short film
2002	The Time Machine	Vox 114	
2002	Drumline	Dr. Lee	
2003	Biker Boyz	Soul Train	
2003	Runaway Jury	Russell	
2004	House of D	Superfly	
2006	Looking for Sunday	Einstein Steinberg	
2007	Primeval	Steve Johnson	
2007	I Think I Love My Wife	Nelson	
2009	8Dazeaweakend	Doctor Feel	
2009	Beyond a Reasonable Doubt	Detective Ben Nickerson	
2009	Cirque du Freak: The Vampire's Assistant	Alexander Ribs	
2010	Misconceptions	Terry Price-Owens	
2011	Seconds Apart	Detective Lampkin	
2011	The Chicago 8	Bobby Seale	
2012	Meridian	Jeff Meyers	Short film
2013	Enemies Closer	Clay Decker	Also producer
2015	The Adventures of Beatle	Dr. Vanderark	
2016	The Book of Love	Cornelius "Dumbass" Thibadeaux	
2016	Planting Seeds of Mindfulness Animated Movie	Will	
2022	88	Harold Roundtree	
2023	Til Death Do Us Part	Groomsman 4	

=== Television ===
Year	Title	Role	Notes
1992	Herman's Head	Cop	Episode: "Guns 'n Neurosis"
1992	A Different World	Troy Douglas	Episode: "Save the Best for Last: Part 1 & 2"
1993	A Cool Like That Christmas	Himself (voice)	Television film
1994	Sound FX	Himself	
1995–1997	Mad TV	Himself	Seasons 1–2
1997	Faster Baby, Kill	Thomas Williams	Episode: "Pilot"
1998	King of the Hill	Kidd Mookie (voice)	Episode: "Traffic Jam"
2001	Who Wants to Be a Millionaire	Himself/Hot Seat Contestant	Episode: "Comedy Edition, Show 1: Seth Green, Orlando Jones, Jimmy Kimmel"
2003	Girlfriends	Dr. Darren Lucas	Episode: "Sex, Lies, and Books"
2003	The Bernie Mac Show	Max Trotter	Episode: "For a Few Dollars More"
2003	The Orlando Jones Show	Host	
2004–2005	Father of the Pride	Snack (voice)	Main role
2005	Wild 'n Out	Himself	Episode: "Orlando Jones"
2006	The Evidence	Inspector Cayman Bishop	Main role
2006	The Adventures of Chico and Guapo	Concepción Rodriguez (voice)	Main role
2007–2008	Everybody Hates Chris	Mr. Newton	Episode: "Everybody Hates the Substitute"
2007–2008	Everybody Hates Chris	Dr. Clint Huckstable	Episode: "Everybody Hates Homecoming"
2007	Men in Trees	George Washington	Recurring role
2007	Ghost Whisperer	Casey Edgars	Episode: "Unhappy Medium"
2008	New Amsterdam	Harold Wilcox	Episode: "Soldier's Heart"
2008	Pushing Daisies	Magnus Olsdatter	Episode: "The Norwegians"
2008	Yin Yang Yo!	Badfoot	Episode: "The Big Payback"
2009	Rules of Engagement	Brad	Recurring role (season 3)
2010	House	Marcus Foreman	Episode: "Moving the Chains"
2010	Tax Man	Fisher	Unsold TV pilot
2011	Necessary Roughness	Lazarus Rollins	2 episodes
2011	CSI: Miami	Lawrence Kingman	Episode: "By the Book"
2011	Identity	Agent Wareing	Television film
2012–2015	Black Dynamite	Additional voices	Recurring role
2013	Tainted Love	Black Barry	Main role
2013	Save Me	God #2	Episode: "Holier Than Thou"
2013–2015	Sleepy Hollow	Captain Frank Irving	Main role (seasons 1–2)
2015	The Haunting of...	Himself	Episode: "The Haunting of Orlando Jones"
2017	Madiba	Oliver Tambo	Main role
2017	Room 104	Samuel	Episode: "The Knockandoo"
2017–2019	American Gods	Mr. Nancy	Recurring role (season 1); main role (season 2)
2019	Law & Order: Special Victims Unit	Justin "Snake Eye" Anderson	Episode: "Diss"
2020	LA's Finest	Lieutenant Marshawn Davis	Recurring role (season 2)
2020	The Good Lord Bird	The Rail Man	Recurring role
2021	Teenage Euthanasia	Little Flor-Ida (voice)	Episode: "The Bad Bang Theory"
2022	Winning Time: The Rise of the Lakers Dynasty	Elgin Baylor	Episode: "Invisible Man"
2022–2025	Abbott Elementary	Martin Eddie	Recurring role; 4 episodes
2025	The Family Business: New Orleans	Gabriel	Recurring role
2026	American Horror Story: 13	Papa Legba	3 episodes

=== Video games ===
Year	Title	Role
2004	Halo 2	Marine Sergeant (voice)
2005	L.A. Rush	Ty Malix (voice)
