= 2005 in machinima =

The following is a list of notable machinima-related events in the year 2005. These include several new machinima productions, season finales, and the 2005 Machinima Film Festival.

== Events ==
- January 26 – Paul Marino moderated a discussion panel on machinima at the 2005 Sundance Film Festival.
- June 21 – Electronic Arts released its first-person shooter computer game Battlefield 2.
- October 27 – October 28 – The Academy of Machinima Arts & Sciences presented machinima pieces at the Austin Game Conference.
- November 8 – Lionhead Studios released its simulation game The Movies, the first game to contain dedicated tools for creating machinima.
- November 12 – The Academy of Machinima Arts & Sciences held the 2005 Machinima Film Festival at the American Museum of the Moving Image.

== Notable releases ==
- February 9 – Edgeworks Entertainment's The Codex premiered.
- May 18 – Season 3 of Rooster Teeth Productions' Red vs. Blue ended with episode 57.
- June 28 – This Spartan Life premiered with the first two modules of episode 1.
- August 13 – The Codex ended with episode 20.
- August 29 – Season 4 of Red vs. Blue began with episode 58.
- September 27 – Rooster Teeth Productions' PANICS premiered.
- October 18 – PANICS ended with episode 4.
- November 22 – Alex Chan posts The French Democracy to The Movies' website.

== Active series ==
- The Codex (2005)
- Fire Team Charlie (2003–2005)
- Neverending Nights (premiered 2004)
- PANICS (2005)
- Red vs. Blue (2003–)
- The Strangerhood (2004–2006)
- Strangerhood Studios (2005)
- This Spartan Life (premiered 2005)
- Time Commanders (2003–2005)

== Awards ==
=== Academy of Machinima Arts & Sciences ===
- Best Picture: Game: On
- Best Series: This Spartan Life
- Best Direction: Whiplash
- Best Virtual Performance: A Few Good G-Men

=== Rockets on Prisoner ===
- Best Movie: The Codex episode 20 ("The End of All Things")
- Best Halo 2 Movie: The Codex episode 20 ("The End of All Things")
- Best Series: Red vs. Blue
- Best Male Performance: Joel Heyman as Caboose from Red vs. Blue
- Best Female Performance: Kathleen Zuelch as Tex from Red vs. Blue
