= This Spartan Life =

American internet talk show based on the Halo franchise

- The opening title sequence of This Spartan Life (using Halo 2 gameplay)
- Game: Halo series
- Genres: Talk show, Comedy, Machinima
- Running time: 30 min. (approx.) per five- or six-part episode
- Created by: Chris Burke
- Release(s): June 28, 2005 –
- Formats: QuickTime, WMV
- No. of episodes: 7 episodes, 9 video blogs

This Spartan Life is a talk show created by Bong + Dern Productions and produced and directed by Chris Burke, who hosts the show under the pseudonym Damian Lacedaemion /ˌlæsɪˈdeɪmiən/. Premiering in 2005 and distributed over the Internet, the show is created using the machinima technique of recording the video and audio from a multiplayer Xbox Live session of Bungie' first-person shooter video game Halo 2. The half-hour episodes are released in six smaller parts, called modules. Guests, such as Bungie's audio director Martin O'Donnell are interviewed via Xbox Live within the online multiplayer worlds of Halo 2, and most recently Halo 3.

In addition to regular shows, special content has been created for Spiketv.com and the 2006 Machinima Festival. A premium edition of Halo 3 includes This Spartan Life content. The show was later distributed on Xbox Live's central hub for Halo, Halo Waypoint. The new episodes on Halo Waypoint included interviews with members of the band OK Go and an interview with Ultima Online creator Richard Garriott.

== Development ==
In 2000, Chris Burke, a Brooklyn sound designer, was playing Halo 2. Burke liked exploring the scenery of the game's maps as if they were real places, and considered the Xbox Live multiplayer service as a social space.

However, before episode one was released the name was changed to This Spartan Life, and all releases have been under that name. The show, while fairly popular, saw a spike in popularity with the release of its fifth blog, which centered on network neutrality. That episode became widespread and was shown to the United States Congress. This Spartan Life experienced a surge in media attention, as shown by This Spartan Life's press page. In October 2009, episode 6 was released after a long hiatus. this was explained in-show that they were 'working out kinks'.

The guests are either interviewed on Xbox Live, or in Bong + Dern's sound booth. Most shows are made, at least in part, on Xbox Live; however, not all of the show segments can be filmed exclusively on Xbox Live, due to issues of in-game latency ("lag"), which would otherwise prevent the coordination seen in the Solid Gold Elite Dancers. The cameras are created using the "gun-drop glitch", which causes them to lose their weapons, thus providing a less obstructed screen. The guests for the show are usually interviewed in Bong + Dern's sound booth. As of the most recent release of media (Episode 5, Module 4) the cast has moved to Halo 3, utilizing the Saved Film feature for capturing.

This Spartan Life straddles the real and virtual world. It is filmed in and intentionally incorporates the unpredictability of the open environment of Xbox Live. During a filming session, others engage earnestly in a multiplayer game in the same area, and may sometimes attack the host or his interviewee. Occasionally, Burke and his guest devolve into firing at each other's avatars.

== Format ==
This Spartan Life features interviews by Burkein character as Damian Lacedaemion, hosting a talk show in Halo's multiplayer levels. Episodes feature skits, tours of the levels, and a dancing troupe ("The Solid Gold Elite Dancers".) Early episodes were often interrupted by other, uninvolved players; the show would stop while the enemies were dispatched. The virtual camera used for recording was in fact another player, with a technique used to drop the character's gun from the frame.

== Recognition ==
This Spartan Life was highlighted as showing the breadth of the medium of machining. has been mentioned by Attack of the Show!, Electronic Gaming Monthly, and Wired Magazine.

Burke created special videos for Spiketv.com and the 2006 Machinima Festival.

This Spartan Life won the award for Best Machinima Series at the 2005 Machinima Film Festival and 2008 Machinima Film Festival. and was nominated for the same award in 2006. The show was featured at Festival Nemo in France.
