= Decisive Battles =

Television series

- Genre: Animated documentary
- Presented by: Matthew Settle
- Country of origin: United States
- No. of episodes: 13

Original release
- Network: History Channel
- Release: 2004

Decisive Battles is a 2004 American animated documentary television series that depicted historic conflicts using the game engine from Rome: Total War to present 3-D simulations of the battles. The show was hosted by Matthew Settle, who usually traveled to the sites of the battles. It originally aired on Fridays on the History Channel, and ran for thirteen episodes in mid-2004. Reruns of the show air on the History International channel and the Military History channel.

== Battles ==
No.	Title	Main battle covered	Airdate (2004)
1	Cannae	Battle of Cannae	July 23
2	Gaugamela	Battle of Gaugamela	July 30
3	Marathon	Battle of Marathon	August 6
4	Thermopylae	Battle of Thermopylae	August 13
5	Spartacus	Third Servile War	August 20
6	Attila the Hun	Battle of Chalons	August 27
7	Crassus: Rich Man, Poor Man	Battle of Carrhae	September 3
8	The Gothic Invasion of Rome	Battle of Adrianople / Sack of Rome	September 10
9	Hail Caesar!	Battle of Pharsalus	September 24
10	Birth of the Roman Empire	Battle of Cynoscephalae	October 1
11	Boudicca: Warrior Queen, AD 61	Battle of Watling Street	October 8
12	Ramses II	Battle of Kadesh	October 15
13	Herman the German	Battle of the Teutoburg Forest	October 22

== See also ==
- Time Commanders
- The Fifteen Decisive Battles of the World
