= Strange Company =

Group of machinima creators and distributors

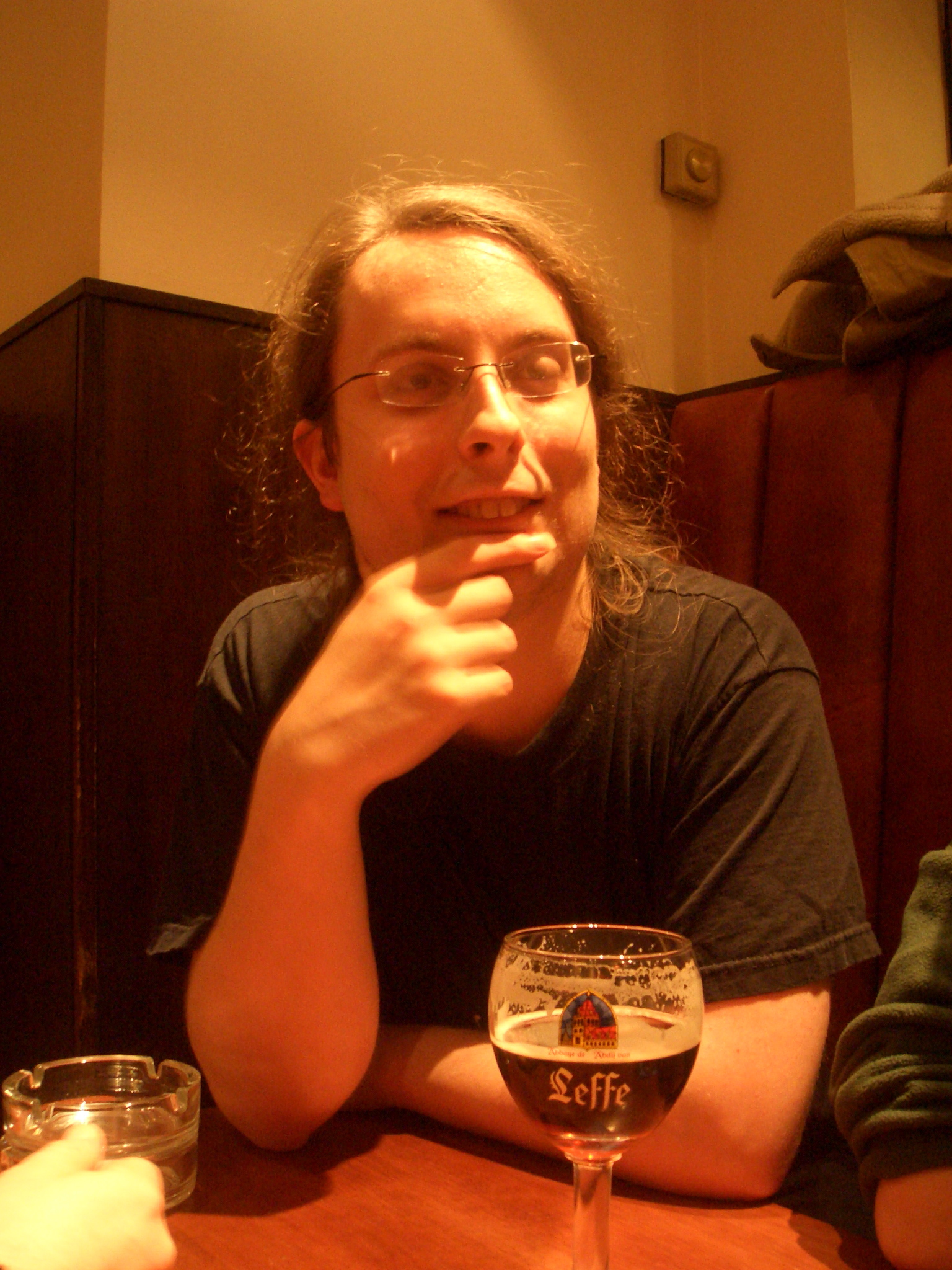
Hugh Hancock, co-founder of Strange Company, in 2004

Strange Company was a group of machinima creators and distributors based in Edinburgh, Scotland. They are known in the medium as the longest-standing machinima production company, having produced machinima films since 1997, and for creating the Machinima.com website, which distributes such films on the internet since 2000.

== History ==
Strange Company was founded by Hugh Hancock in 1997, at the time a student at the University of Edinburgh and a part-time journalist with an interest in the computer game Quake, and Gordon McDonald, a commercial film-maker and soundscape artist. Following Hancock's coining of the term "machinima" with Anthony Bailey of Quake done Quick, Hancock and McDonald founded the Machinima.com website in 2000, a hub for machinima producers on the internet.

Having worked on commercial animation production since 1999, Strange Company currently focuses on the creation of machinima productions. The company has produced animation for companies and organisations such as Electronic Arts, the British Academy of Film and Television Arts, Scottish Television and the BBC. The group has also created several independent releases, including the H.P. Lovecraft inspired Eschaton: Darkening Twilight, and an adaptation of the Percy Bysshe Shelley sonnet "Ozymandias".

The group spent a number of years working on the "Lithtech Film Producer" project, the first attempt to create a stand-alone machinima production environment, which was cancelled in 2001. In March 2002, they participated in the formation of the Academy of Machinima Arts & Sciences.

In 2006, Strange Company produced its first feature-length machinima film, BloodSpell. After two years of pre-production, BloodSpell was released in 14 episodes during 2006. In October 2007, it premiered as a full-length feature film at the Machinima Europe festival 2007. In 2008, the film was released as a DVD image under a Creative Commons license.

In 2007, Hancock and fellow Strange Company member Johnnie Ingram wrote Machinima for Dummies, a 400-page reference guide to machinima creation.

The most recent Strange Company release is a short film adaptation of a Lord Byron poem entitled, "When We Two Parted.", which was featured on the front page of YouTube UK on its release. Many of the Strange Company team also worked on the Boingboing-featured scientific cookery show Kamikaze Cookery, although it is not indicated as an official Strange Company production.

In March 2010, Strange Company announced a high-profile project, a performance capture/Machinima hybrid title Death Knight Love Story, featuring the voices of Joanna Lumley, Jack Davenport, Anna Chancellor and Brian Blessed. Death Knight Love Story is a short romance/action adventure, and was released in 2014.

In November 2017, Strange Company released the VR RPG game "Left-Hand Path" on Steam. It received "Very Positive" reviews rating on the site.

On February 5, 2018, founder Hugh Hancock died of a heart attack.

== Releases ==
- Eschaton: Darkening Twilight (1997)
- Eschaton: Nightfall (1999)
- Ozymandias (1999)
- Matrix 4X1 (2000)
- Tum Raider (2001)
- BloodSpell (2006)
- Fair Game (2007)
- When We Two Parted (2008)
- Death Knight Love Story (2014)
- Left-Hand Path (2017 Video Game)
