= Time Commanders =

British television series

- Genre: Technological game show
- Created by: Adam MacDonald
- Presented by: Eddie Mair (2003–04); Richard Hammond (2005); Gregg Wallace (2016)
- Country of origin: United Kingdom
- Original language: English
- No. of series: 3
- No. of episodes: 27

Production
- Running time: 45–60 minutes
- Production company: Lion Television

Original release
- Network: BBC Two (2003–05); BBC Four (2016)
- Release: 4 September 2003 – 27 December 2016

Related
- Decisive Battles

Time Commanders is a technological game show that originally aired on BBC Two from 4 September 2003 to 13 March 2005 with Eddie Mair hosting the first series and Richard Hammond hosting the second series. It returned for a 3-part special on BBC Four from 12 to 27 December 2016 with Gregg Wallace as host.

== Format ==
In the first two series, teams of four contestants directed opposite forces. The teams were unfamiliar with computer games, to make sure their gaming skills did not influence their success. In the 2016 revival, two teams of three controlled opposing factions (for example, one team would play as Carthage and the other as Rome).

After a brief introduction of the battle, including an overview of military units, terrain and available forces, the players had to develop a strategy and then deploy their forces. In the first two series, two of the players were selected as generals, who directed the battle and had access to a strategic map; in the 2016 revival, only one player was selected as the general. The other two players were designated lieutenants in the first series, and captains in the second series and 2016 revival. The units were indirectly controlled by the lieutenants, who issued commands to programme assistants, who in turn used the game interface to control the units. Troop deployment and battle followed, although in both the 2005 and 2016 series there was a small skirmish conducted as a separate event to acquaint the players with the game mechanics and their units. In the 2016 series the teams also got strategic pauses where they could refine their strategies.

During each game, a pair of military specialists analysed the performance of the players and explained how the real historical battle unfolded. Lynette Nusbacher appeared in every episode of the first two series and was joined on a rotating basis by Mike Loades, Saul David, Mark Urban or Dr. Adrian Goldsworthy, the series' historical advisor. In the 2016 revival, Nusbacher and Loades fulfilled this role in all three episodes.

== Background ==
The game engine used was based on Rome: Total War, the game being released a year later. Rome: Total War designer and writer Mike Brunton said, "Time Commanders did use Rome code pretty much 'as is', with tweaks for different troop types and camera controls". The televised programmes contained no reference to the origin of the software powering the 3D visuals, due to the BBC's rules against product placement; however, Rome: Total War makers The Creative Assembly were named in the credits of the show with a specific mention of them providing the game engine.

== Related media ==
A tie-in book was written by Peter Harrison and published by Virgin Books in 2004, called Time Commanders: Great Battles of the Ancient World. It covered the 16 battles of the first series, along with details of all the contestants in each of the teams, which battle and which army they each played and whether they won or lost the battle they had been given.

== Airings ==
Series	Start date	End date	Episodes
1	4 September 2003	26 March 2004	16
2	16 January 2005	13 March 2005	8
3	12 December 2016	27 December 2016	3

== Episodes ==
Series 1 (2003):

1. Trebia (218 BC)
2. Watling Street (AD 60 or 61)
3. Bibracte (58 BC)
4. Mons Graupius (AD 83)
5. Tigranocerta (69 BC)
6. Pharsalus (48 BC)
7. Cannae (216 BC)
8. Raphia (217 BC)
9. Qadesh (1274 BC)
10. Leuctra (371 BC)
11. Adrianople (AD 378)
12. Telamon (225 BC)
13. Gaugamela (331 BC)
14. Chalons (AD 451)
15. Marathon (490 BC)
16. Silarus River (71 BC)

Series 2 (2005):

1. Teutoburg Forest (AD 9)
2. Stamford Bridge (AD 1066)
3. Hydaspes (326 BC)
4. Cynoscephalae (197 BC)
5. Dara (AD 530)
6. Troy (circa 1200s BC)
7. Hastings (AD 1066)
8. Sarmizegethusa (AD 106)

Series 3 (2016):

1. Battle of Zama 202 BC
2. The Battle of Waterloo, June 1815
3. Battle of the Catalaunian Plains, June 451 AD (same battle as series 1, episode 14, under a different name)
