= BloodSpell =

2006 fantasy film

- Engine: Aurora Engine
- Genre: Fantasy
- Running time: 90 min.
- Created by: Hugh Hancock
- Voices: Thom Tuck; Charmaine Gilbert; Alan Cross; Caroline Dunford; Paul A J Hamilton; Johnnie Ingram; Russell Lotan; Sian Bevan; Jehane Barbour; David Reed
- Crew: Steve Wallace; Johnnie Ingram; Ross Bambrey; Justin Hall; Chris Cornwell; Ben Sanders; Phil Rice "Dragal 23"; Murray Robertson
- Release(s): 26 April 2006 – 8 December 2006
- Formats: QuickTime, WMV, DivX
- No. of episodes: 14
- Website https://www.bloodspell.com/

BloodSpell is a 2006 fantasy film produced by Strange Company. BloodSpell employs filming techniques known as machinima, and is the first feature-length production to use BioWare's Aurora Engine, developed for the role-playing video game Neverwinter Nights, to generate the video portion of the film. The film was serially released in short episodes under the Creative Commons Attribution-NonCommercial-ShareAlike 2.5 License, which allows for redistribution, modification, and creation of fan fiction. Strange Company have asserted somewhat controversially that, as of 2006, BloodSpell, was the largest machinima production. The series features numerous cameo appearances, including several voice appearances from science fiction author Charles Stross.

== Plot ==
BloodSpell tells the fictional story of Jered, a young Monk of the Church of the Angels, an organisation that exists to purify the Blooded, a term for those who release magical power when their blood is spilt. The story follows Jered as he joins forces with the Blooded in an attempt to gain his freedom.

== Development ==
BloodSpell was in development for more than two years. In late 2003, executive producer Hugh Hancock first began to work on the project in response to a claim that his work had lost its "punk edge". Production costs were under £10,000.

The film was made using the Neverwinter Nights Aurora game engine, which provides a Dungeon Master (DM) client that allows actor models to be created or removed at will. Multiple DMs can join a single local Neverwinter Nights server. Under this configuration, any character can be controlled by any of the DMs to accomplish actions that are needed for the scene being filmed.

Additionally, a number of modifications to Neverwinter Nights are used, from additional animations, to a custom set of camera tools, allowing scripted camera movements, to a texture switching OpenGL tool that allows for the appearance of lip syncing, referred to by the BloodSpell team as "TOGLFaceS" (Take Over GL Face Skins).

== Releases ==
The first trailer for BloodSpell was released on 19 October 2005 and was followed by two teaser trailers in late April 2006. The first episode premiered on 26 April 2006, and the series concluded in late 2006 after fourteen episodes.

In August 2006, controversy involving BloodSpell occurred when the Leipzig Games Convention pronounced it too violent to be shown as part of their machinima showcase. The Games Conference later changed their position and allowed the film to be shown.

In 2007, the fourteen episodes were remastered into a feature film. In early 2008, a DVD image of the feature-length edit of BloodSpell was released under Creative Commons at the official site. The DVD includes three "Making of BloodSpell" documentaries.
