= List of machinima festivals =

This is a list of film festivals dedicated to machinima, the use of real-time 3-D engines in filmmaking. The Academy of Machinima Arts & Sciences (AMAS) regularly holds such festivals, and recognizes exemplary machinima works through awards nicknamed the Mackies.

== Machinima Expo ==
The Machinima Expo (or "MachinExpo") is an annual international machinima festival started in 2008. In 2010 the organization expanded and is now run with help of a large team of volunteers. Submission is accepted during the summer months and the event takes place in November on the Internet and in the virtual world of Second Life".

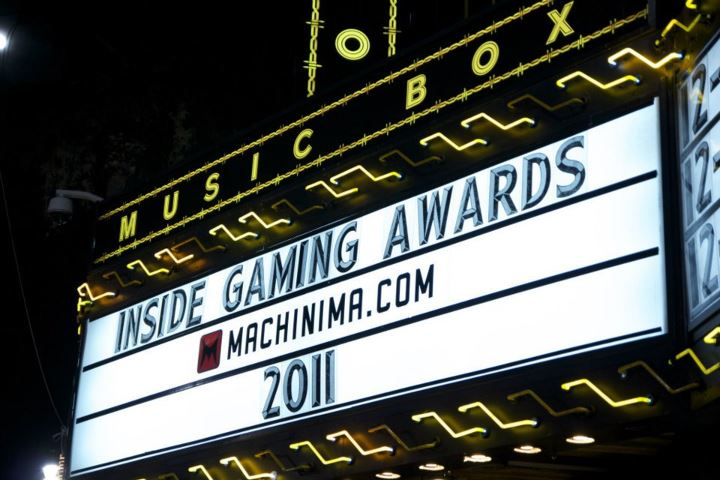
Gaming Awards 2011

== Machinima Film Festival ==
On July 17, 2002, the first Machinima Film Festival, sponsored by NVIDIA, was held as part of QuakeCon 2002. However, according to David Stellmack of TG Daily, the larger QuakeCon event seemed to overshadow the festival, which was "not very well attended".

The 2005 Machinima Film Festival was held on November 12, 2005 at the American Museum of the Moving Image in Astoria, New York.

The first Machinima Festival Europe was held in Leicester on 12–14 October 2007. The festival was hosted by De Montfort University’s Institute of Creative Technologies (IOCT), and supported by the AMAS.

== Milan Machinima Festival ==
The Milan Machinima Festival (MMF) is an annual event in Italy focused on machinima, spotlighting filmmakers who use video games and real-time technologies to create moving image works. Dedicated to exploring the intersections of video art, cinema, animation, and gaming, the festival presents a curated selection of machinima works chosen by an international jury for their cultural significance, artistic innovation, and experimental approach, alongside an open call for emerging creators and a program of lectures, seminars, workshops, and publications. The Milan Machinima Festival MMXXV, under the theme REBOOT/RESTART/RESET, was held from March 17–23, 2025, with hybrid presentations—including online screenings and in-person events at Vidiots in Los Angeles, California. Featuring a curated lineup of 31 machinima and game-based videos created by 35 artists from 18 countries, the festival explored works that push narrative boundaries and repurpose game engines as cinematic tools. The onsite screenings took place on March 20 and 21 at Vidiots' MUBI Microcinema, and the selection was organized across nine thematic programs such as Game Engine Cinema, Game Video Essay, Made in Italy, and Reprogrammed Visions.

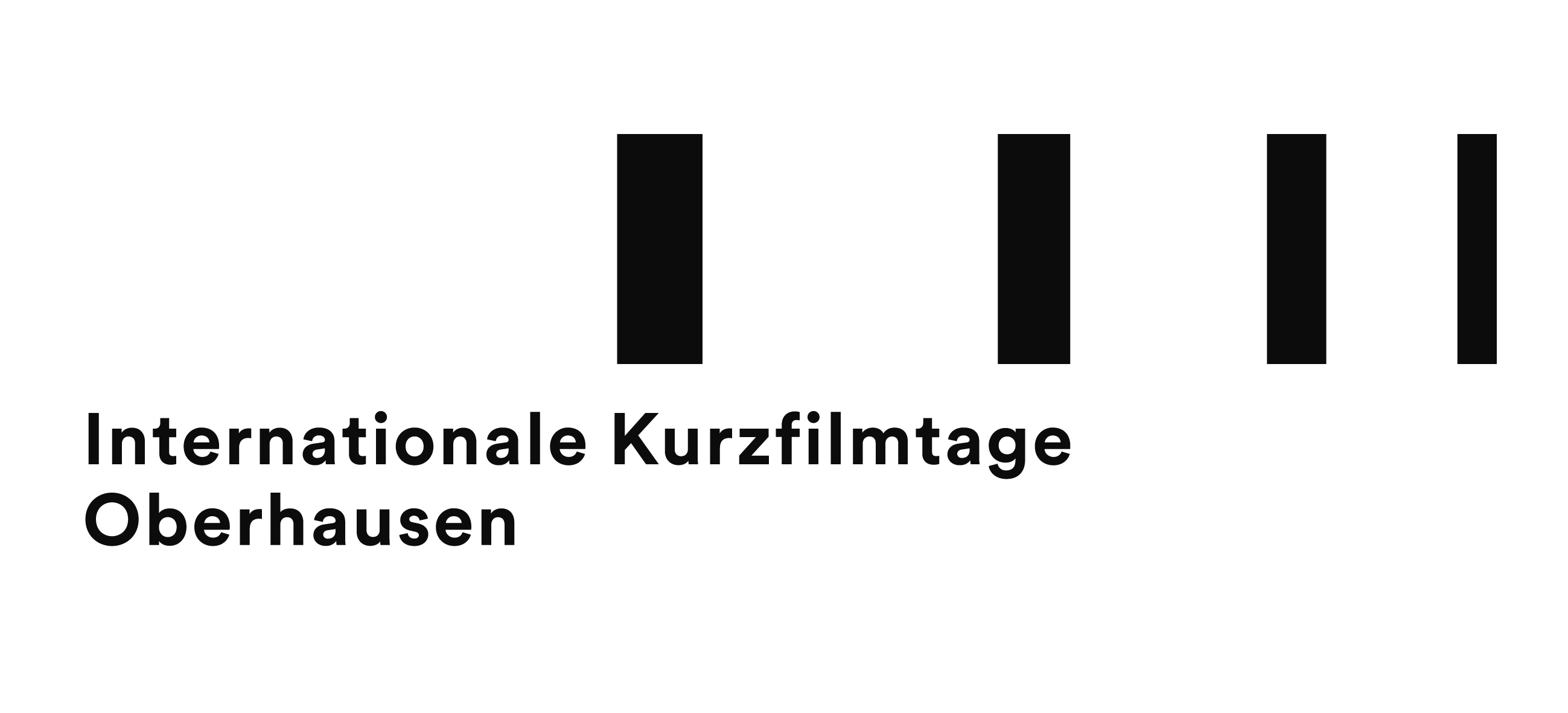
Oberhausen International Short Film Festival

== Oberhausen International Short Film Festival ==
The 69th edition of the Internationale Kurzfilmtage Oberhausen, held from April 26 to May 1, 2023, featured “Against Gravity. The Art of Machinima” as its central thematic programme. This marked the first instance of a major international film festival devoting extensive curatorial attention to machinima as a distinct artistic practice. Curated by Vladimir Nadein and Dmitry Frolov, the programme foregrounded machinima’s capacity to subvert the formal and narrative conventions of digital gaming environments. Through a diverse selection of works, the curators highlighted the medium's potential to engage critically with contemporary political and cultural discourses. In this context, machinima was positioned not only as a cinematic technique but also as a tool for artistic emancipation within virtual and real-time 3D spaces.
