= List of French people of immigrant origin =

Below are lists of notable French people of immigrant origin (at least one great-grandparent due to their families' lineages).

== Algeria ==
Actors and filmmakers

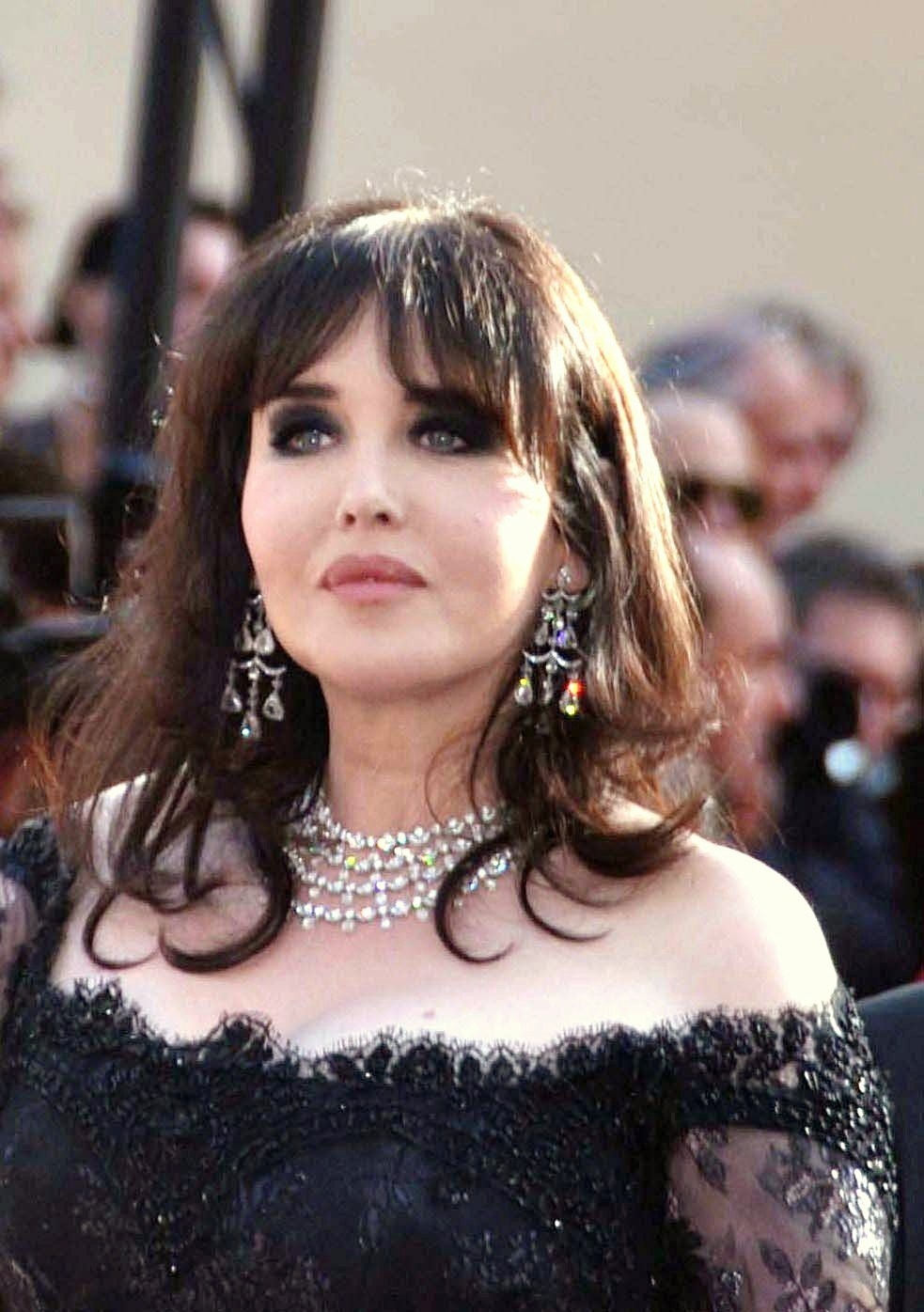
Isabelle Adjani

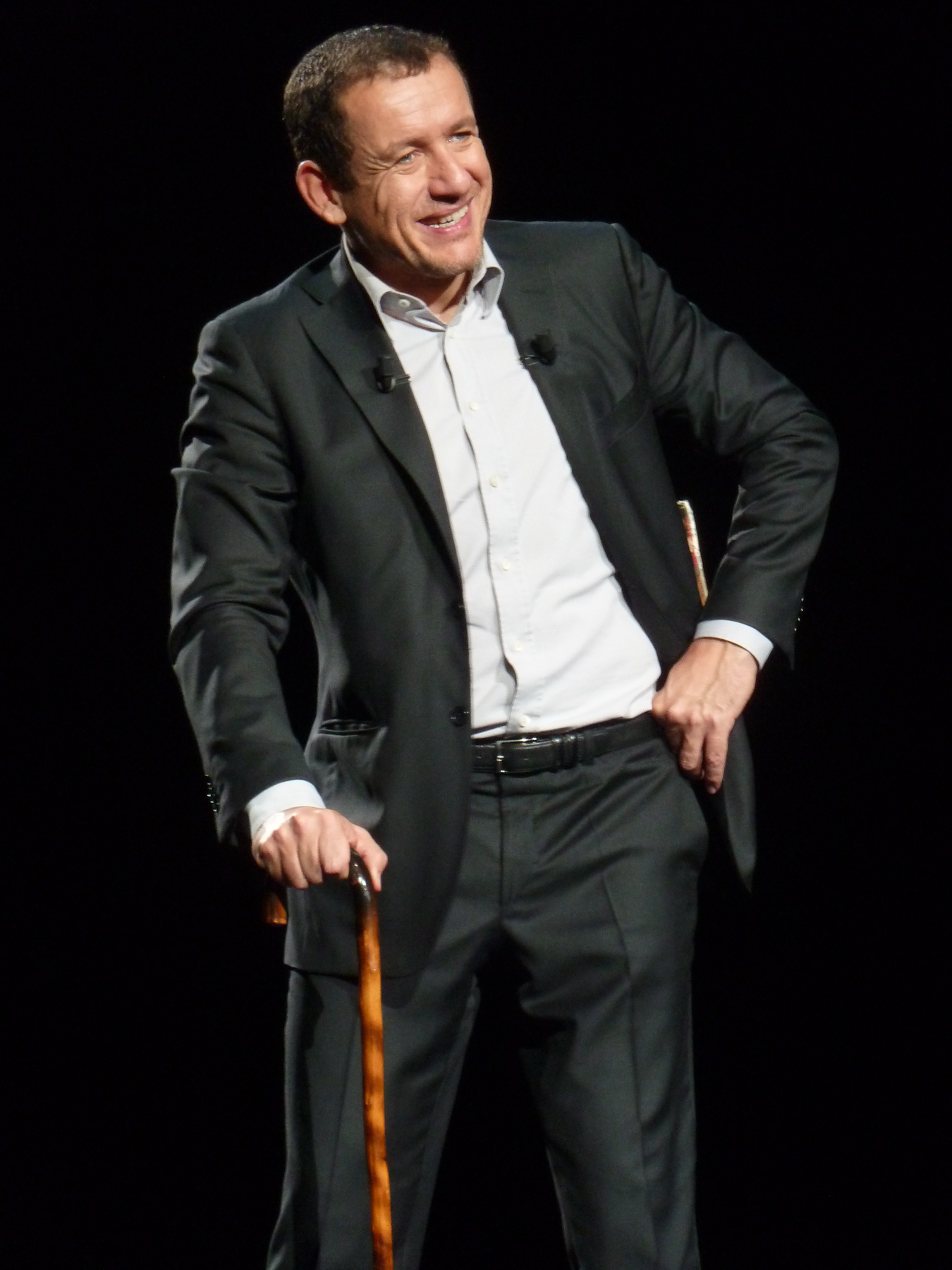
Dany Boon

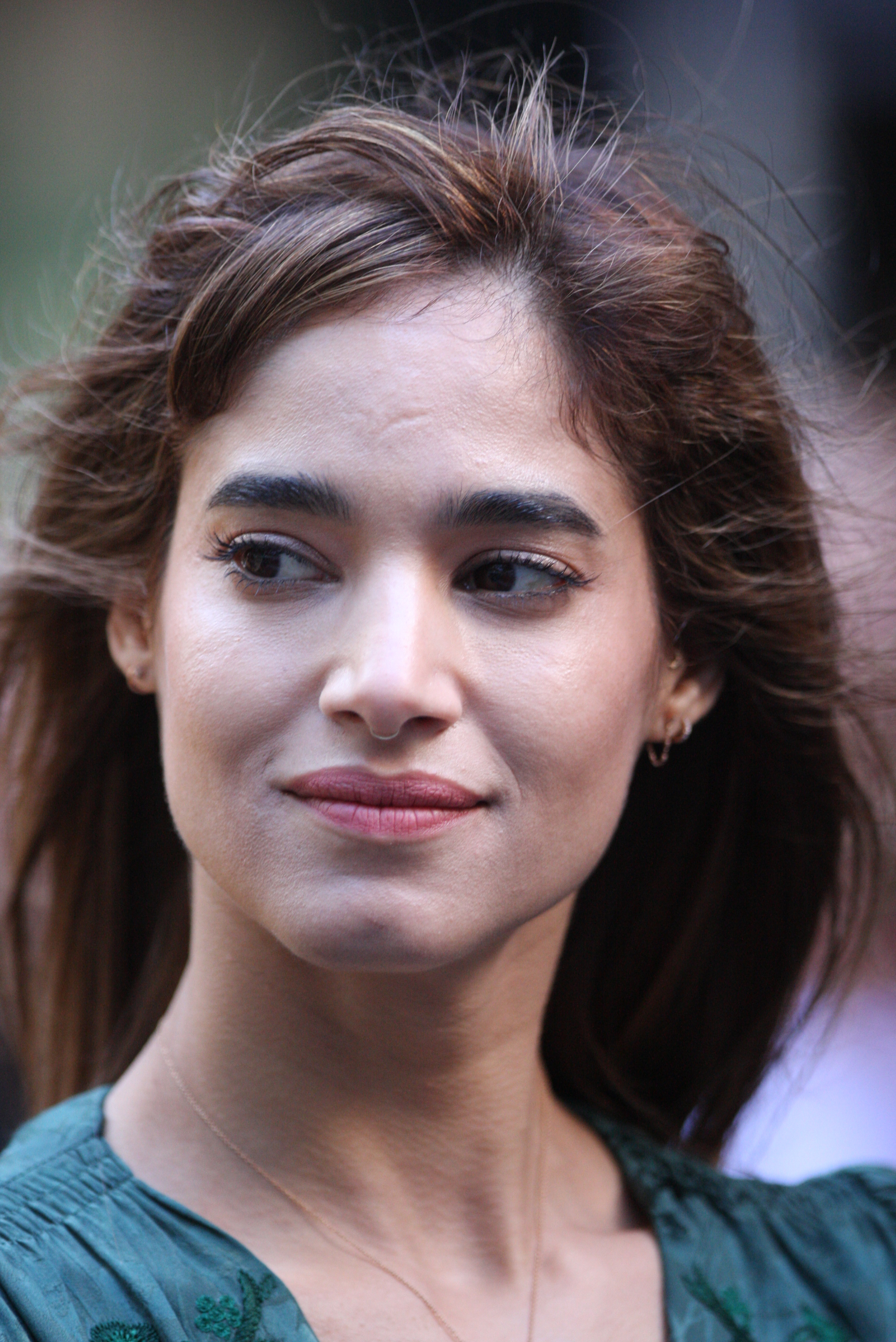
Sofia Boutella

- Kev Adams, actor
- Isabelle Adjani, actress
- Daniel Auteuil, actor
- Jean-Pierre Bacri, actor
- Leïla Bekhti, actress
- Yamina Benguigui, film director, Junior Minister for French Nationals Abroad and Relations with La Francophonie (French-language countries worldwide) at the Ministry of Foreign Affairs
- Jean Benguigui, actor
- Richard Berry, actor
- Dany Boon, actor, comedian
- Rachid Bouchareb, film director
- Sofia Boutella, actress
- Rachida Brakni, actress
- Alain Chabat, comedian, film director, scriptwriter and producer
- Élie Chouraqui, film director, producer and scriptwriter
- Gérard Darmon, actor
- Samir Guesmi, actor
- Roger Hanin, actor filmmaker
- Hafsia Herzi, actress
- Salim Kechiouche, actor
- Claude Lelouch, film director, producer, scriptwriter and actor
- Jalil Lespert, actor
- Maïwenn, actress, film director
- Kad Merad, actor
- Samy Naceri, actor
- Marie-José Nat, actress
- Mehdi Nebbou, actor
- Safy Nebbou, actor
- Daniel Prévost, actor and comedian
- Tahar Rahim, actor
- Sabrina Ouazani, actress
- Samy Seghir, actor
- Zinedine Soualem, actor
- Michaël Youn, actor
- Malik Zidi, actor

Singers and musicians

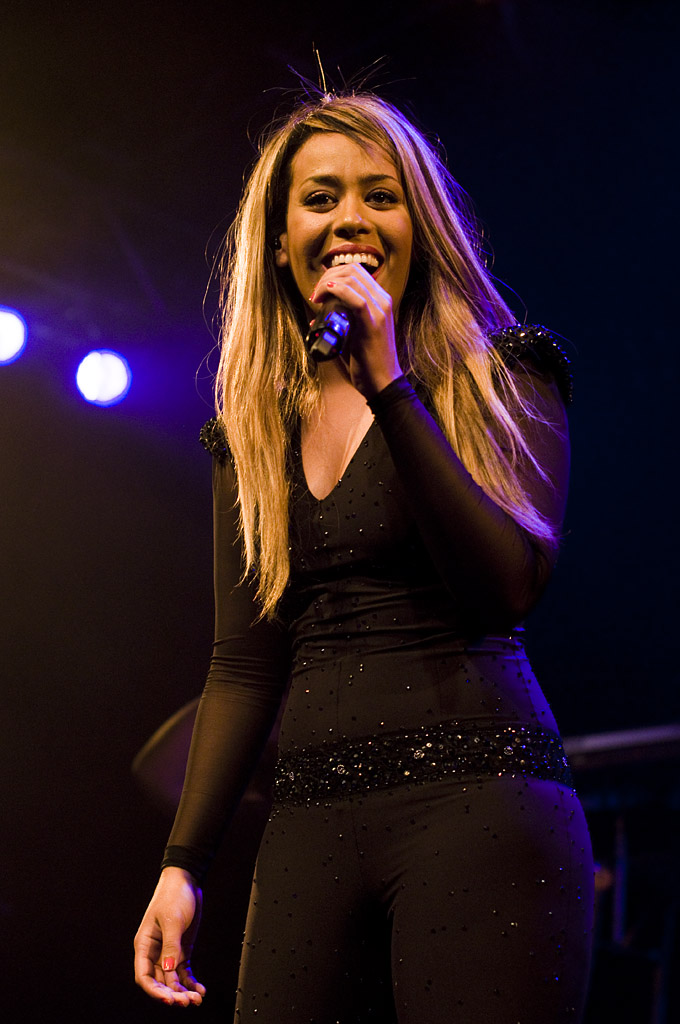
Amel Bent

- Chimène Badi, singer
- Amel Bent, singer
- Cheb Mami, singer
- Chico Bouchikhi, singer, co-founder of the Gipsy Kings
- Patrick Bruel, singer
- Étienne Daho, singer
- DJ Mam's, DJ, music producer
- DJ Snake, DJ
- Quentin Elias, singer, part of Alliage
- Kenza Farah, singer
- Faudel, singer
- Indila, singer
- Jenifer, singer
- Camélia Jordana, singer
- Khaled, singer
- Sheryfa Luna, singer
- Slimane, singer
- Enrico Macias, singer
- Médine, rapper
- Marcel Mouloudji, poet and singer
- Merwan Rim, singer
- Martial Solal, jazz pianist

Sportspeople

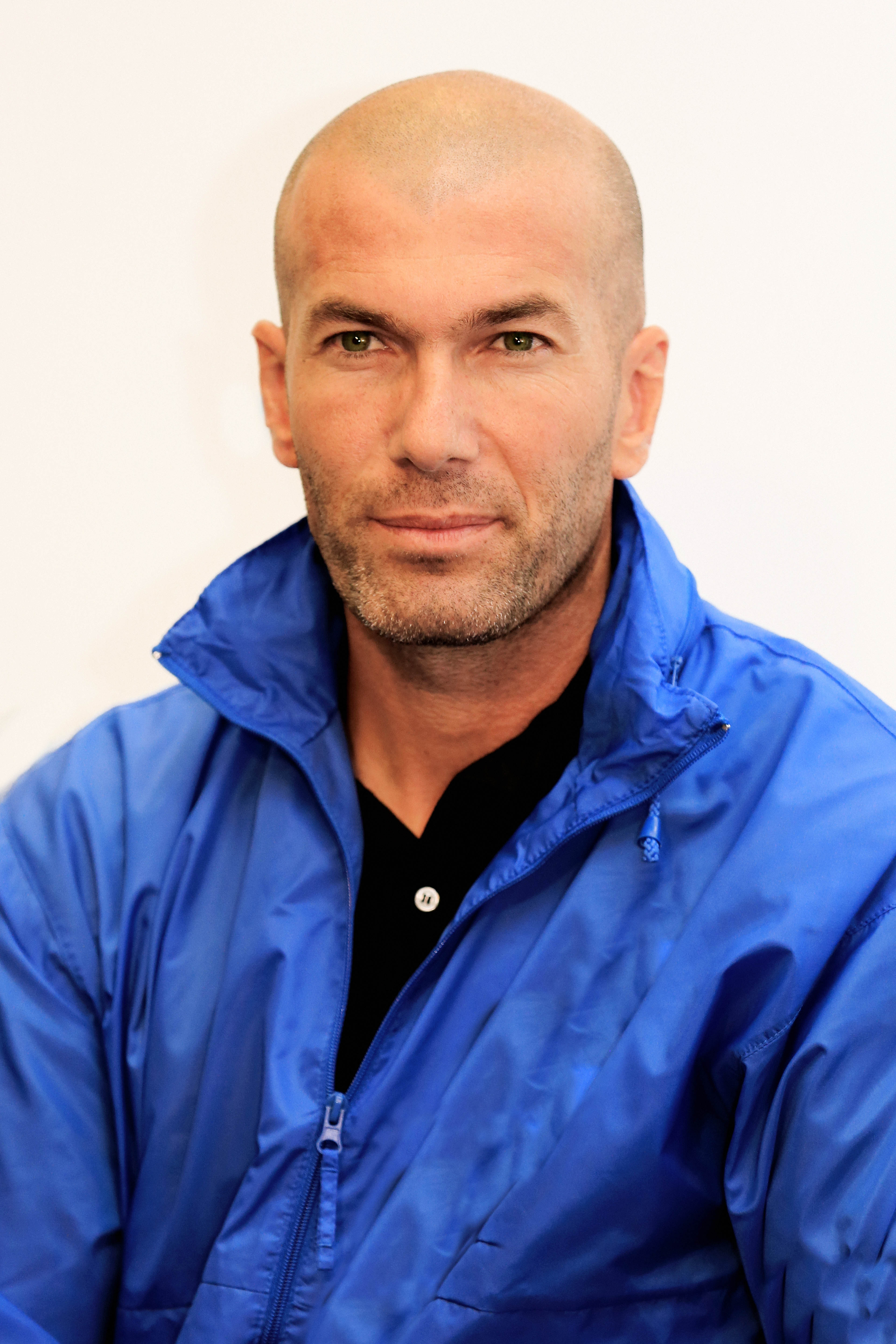
Zinedine Zidane

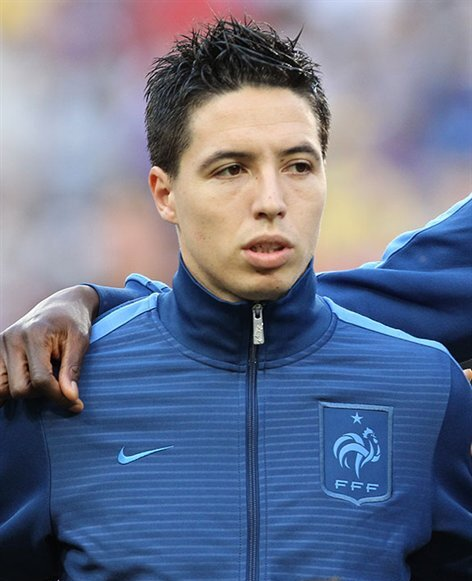
Samir Nasri

- Karim Benzema, footballer
- Nabil Fekir, footballer
- Alphonse Halimi, boxer
- Kylian Mbappé, footballer
- Maxime Mermoz, professional rugby union footballer
- Riyad Mahrez, footballer
- Alfred Nakache, swimmer, water polo
- Samir Nasri, footballer
- Alain Mimoun, Olympic marathon champion
- Brahim Zaibat, dancer
- Zinedine Zidane, football manager and former player
- Rédouane Hennouni-Bouzidi, athlete

Others

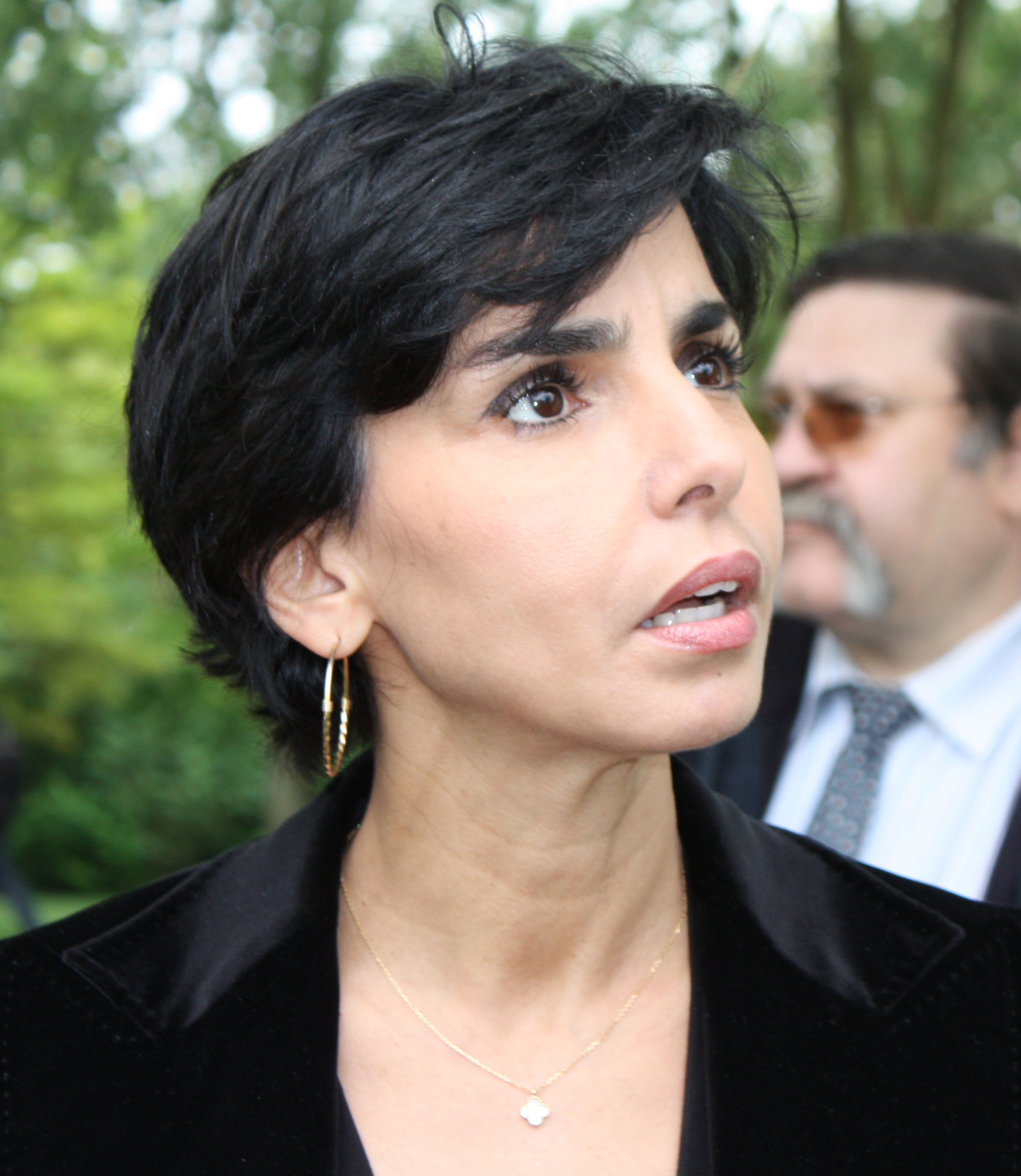
Rachida Dati

- Fadela Amara, Secretary of State
- Kader Arif, Junior Minister for Veterans at the French Ministry of Defence
- Jacques Attali, economist, writer
- Amin Maalouf, author
- Alain Bashung, author, composer, performer and comedian
- Azouz Begag, writer and politician
- Nabilla Benattia, reality TV personality
- Nina Bouraoui, writer
- Hélène Cixous, writer
- Annie Cohen-Solal, writer
- Claude Cohen-Tannoudji, physicist, Nobel Prize (1997)
- Jean-François Copé, politician
- Rachida Dati, Minister of Justice
- Jacques Derrida, philosopher
- Julien Dray, politician
- Jean-Pierre Elkabbach, journalist
- Bernard-Henri Lévy, writer and philosopher
- Arnaud Montebourg, France's Minister of Industrial Renewal since May 2012
- Benjamin Stora, historian

== Argentina ==
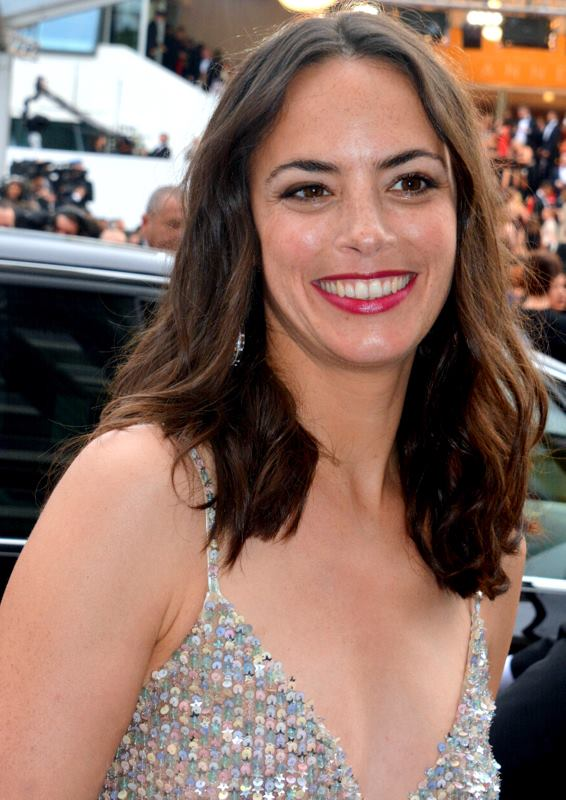
Bérénice Bejo

- Keny Arkana, singer and rap artist
- Bérénice Bejo, actress
- David Trezeguet, football player
- Bigflo & Oli, hip-hop duo

== Armenia ==
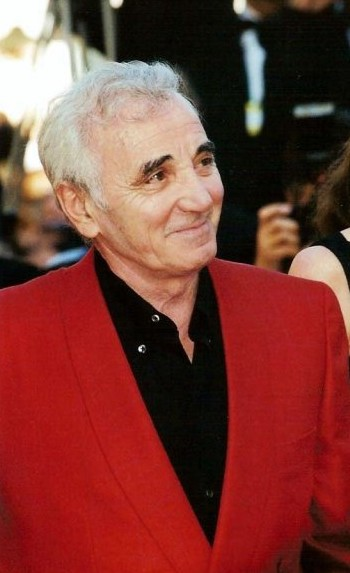
Charles Aznavour

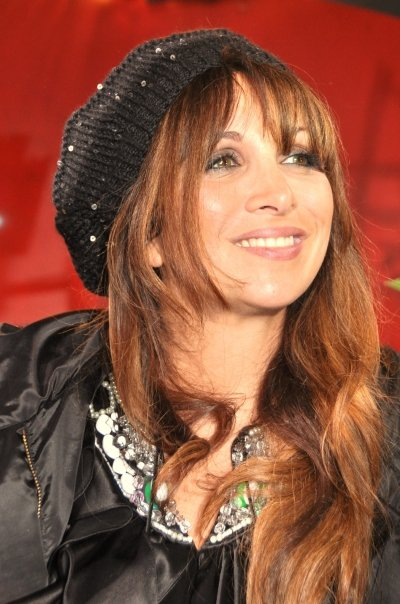
Hélène Ségara

- Simon Abkarian, actor
- Serge Avédikian, producer
- Charles Aznavour, singer
- Édouard Balladur, former Prime Minister
- Jean Carzou, painter
- Patrick Devedjian, ministre
- Youri Djorkaeff, soccer player
- Patrick Fiori, singer
- Robert Guédiguian, film director
- Francis Kurkdjian, perfumer
- Marie Laforêt, actress
- Michel Legrand, music composer, arranger, conductor, pianist and prolific movie & TV score composer
- Missak Manouchian, poet, communist militant during World War II
- André Manoukian, composer, musician
- Mathieu Madénian, humorist, actor
- Alain Prost, racing driver
- Hélène Ségara, singer
- Jean Ter-Merguerian, violinist
- Michael Vartan, actor
- Sylvie Vartan, singer, of partial Jewish ancestry
- Francis Veber, film director, screenwriter and producer and theater playwright
- Henri Verneuil, filmmaker

== Australia ==
- Tina Arena, singer
- Katrina Patchett, dancer

== Austria ==
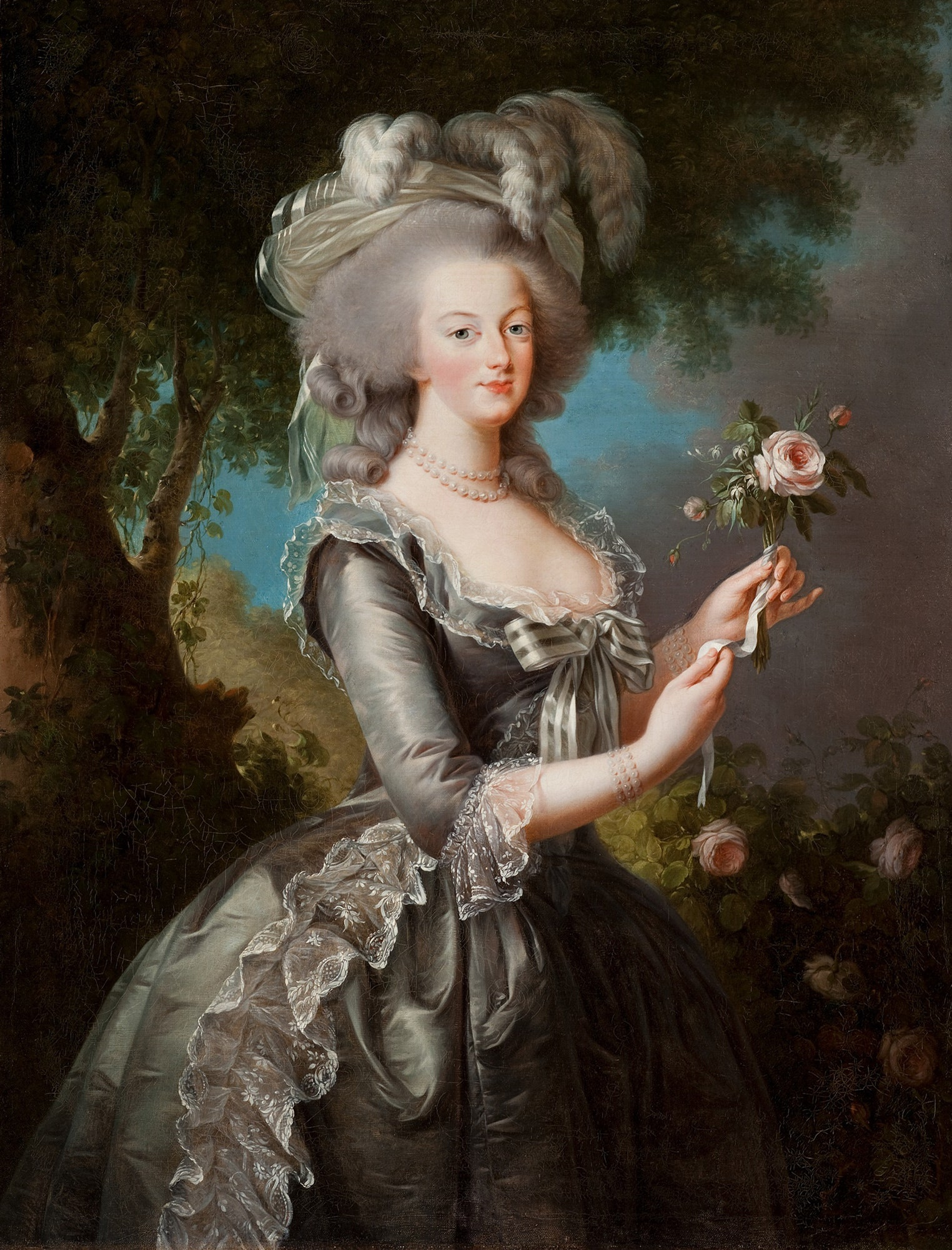
Marie Antoinette

- Marie Antoinette, last queen of France, from 1774 until 1792
- Nora Arnezeder, actress
- Yael Grobglas, actress
- Romy Schneider, actress
- Erich von Stroheim, actor

== Bangladesh ==
- Zamor, servant of Madame du Barry

== Belgium ==
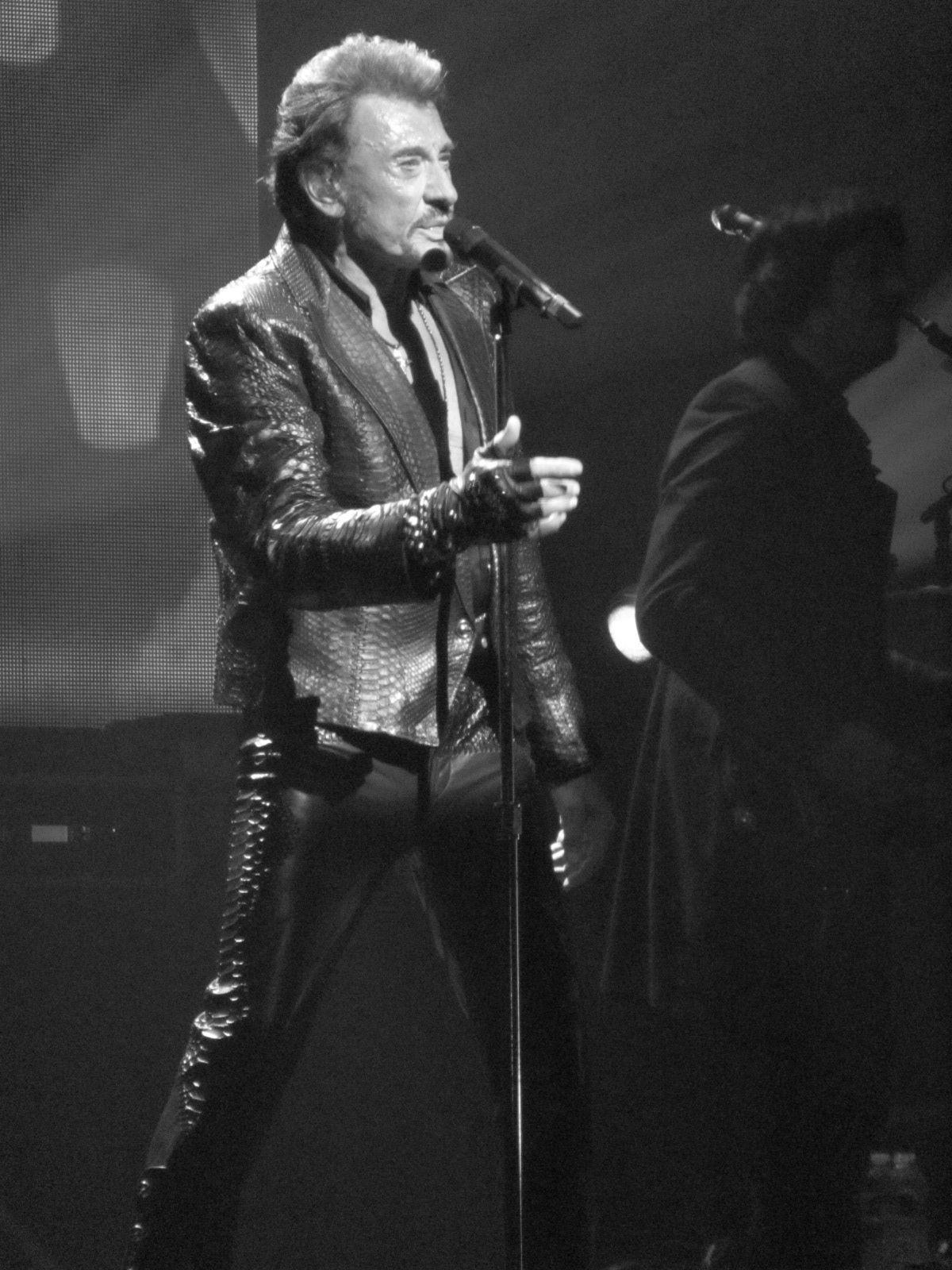
Johnny Hallyday

- Booba, rapper
- Jacqueline, Countess of Hainaut, dauphine of France
- Raymond Devos, humorist
- Fiona Ferro, tennis player
- David Guetta, house music DJ
- Johnny Hallyday, singer
- Pierre Louÿs, poet and writer
- Olivier Minne, television presenter
- Iris Mittenaere, Miss France 2016
- Agnès Varda, film director

== Benin ==
- Valériane Ayayi, basketball player
- Flora Coquerel, Miss France 2014
- Rudy Gestede, footballer
- Jules Koundé, footballer

== Bermuda ==
- Vanessa James, figure skater

== Bosnia ==
- Josiane Balasko, actress

== Brazil ==
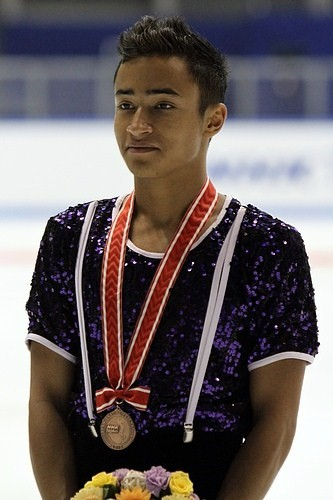
Florent Amodio

- Florent Amodio, figure skater
- Carla Bruni, singer and ex-First Lady of France
- Gil de Ferran, driver
- Jean-Louis de Rambures, journalist
- Carlos Ghosn, businessman
- Louane, singer
- Artur Avila, mathematician
- Pierre, Duke of Penthièvre, French Duke
- Princess Françoise of Orléans, French princess
- Prince Antônio Gastão of Orléans-Braganza, Brazilian prince
- Prince Luís of Orléans-Braganza, Brazilian prince
- Princess Francisca of Brazil, Brazilian princess
- Princess Januária of Brazil, Brazilian princess

== British Isles ==
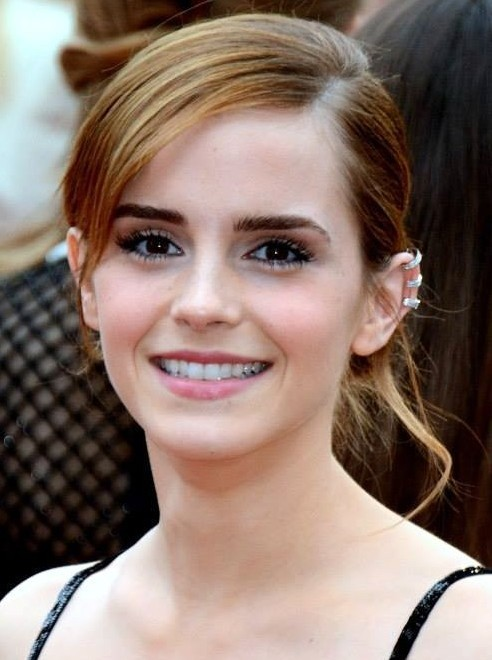
Emma Watson

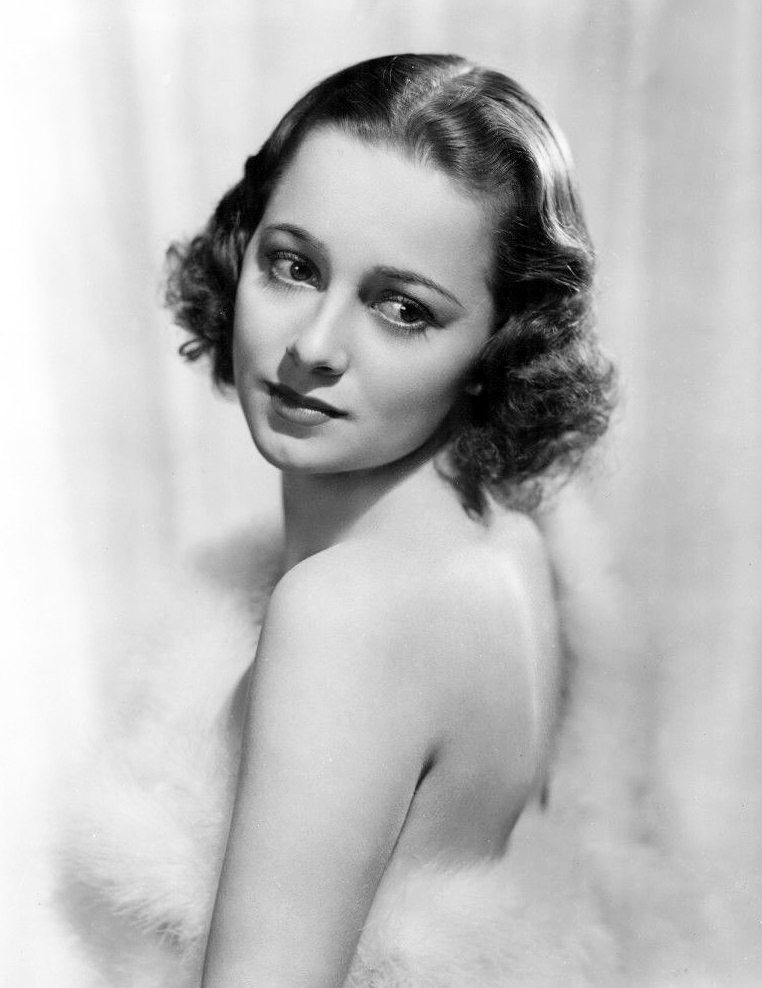
Olivia de Havilland

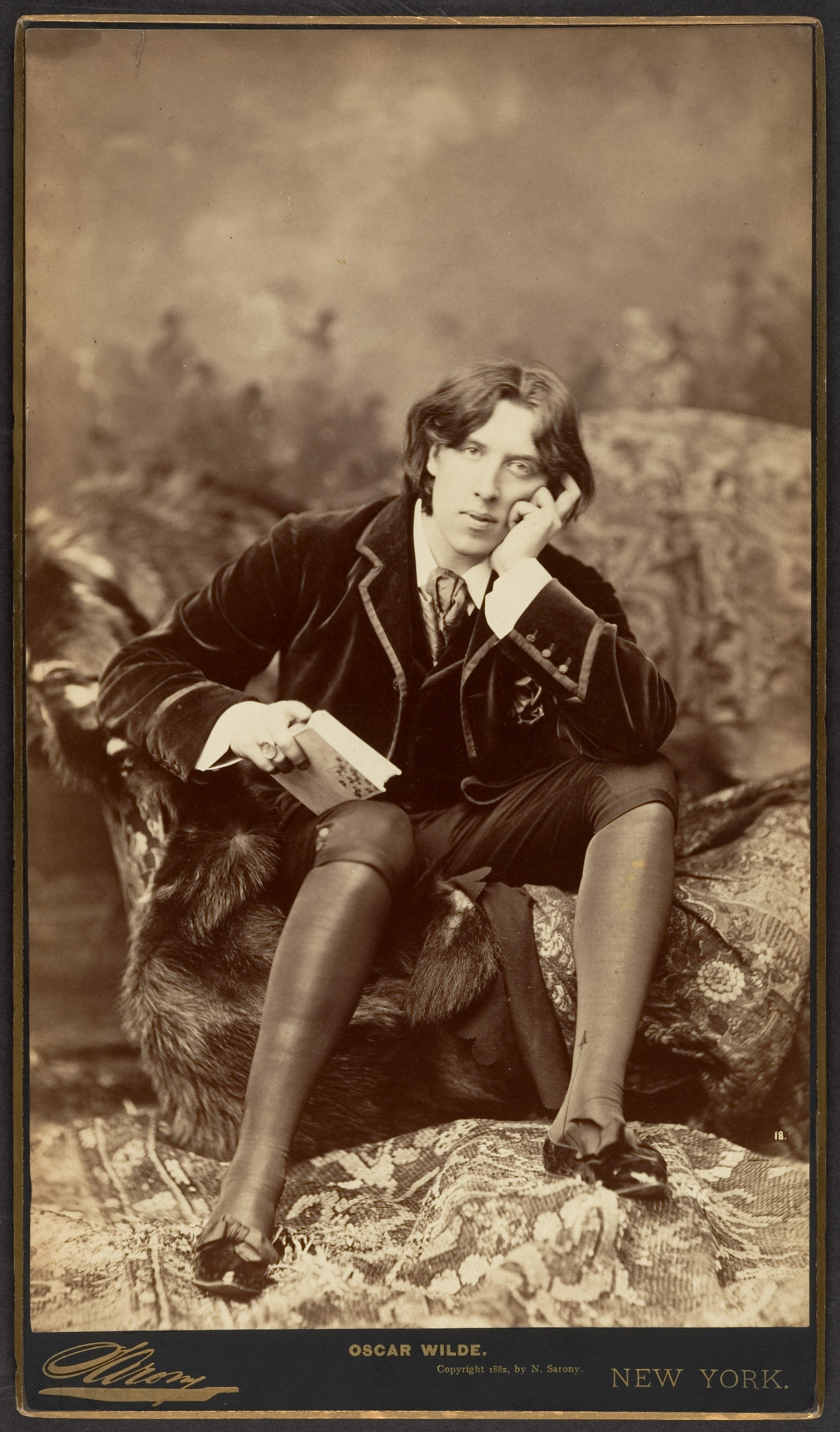
Oscar Wilde

- Samuel Beckett, novelist and writer
- Anastasia Griffith, actress
- Margaret Kelly, dancer
- Jeanne Moreau, actress
- Marie-Louise O'Murphy, mistress of Louis XV
- Oscar Wilde, writer
- Jane Birkin, actress
- Claudette Colbert, actress
- Nancy Cunard, writer
- Deanna Durbin, actress and singer
- Henrietta of England, English princess
- James FitzJames, military leader and son of James II of England
- Emma, Lady Hamilton, model and actress
- Olivia de Havilland, actress
- Delilah, singer
- Charlotte Gainsbourg, actress
- François Grosjean, psycholinguist and specialist on bilingualism
- Louise de Kérouaille, mistress of Charles II of England
- Emily Loizeau, singer
- Michael Lonsdale, actor
- Alexis Michalik, actor
- Diana Mitford, socialite
- Jeanne Moreau, actress and singer
- Oswald Mosley, politician
- Charlotte Rampling, actress
- Matthew Raymond-Barker, singer
- Louisa Maria Stuart, princess, daughter of James II of England
- Peter Townsend, Royal Air Force officer
- Uffie, singer
- Lucy Walter, mistress of Charles II of England
- Emma Watson, actress, Harry Potter film series
- Eadgifu of Wessex, queen of France
- Michel Adanson, botanist and naturalist
- Henri d'Angoulême, military commander during the Wars of Religion.
- Brice Lalonde, politician
- Sebastian Roché, actor
- Janet Stewart, mistress of Henry II
- Margaret Stewart, dauphine of France

== Bulgaria ==
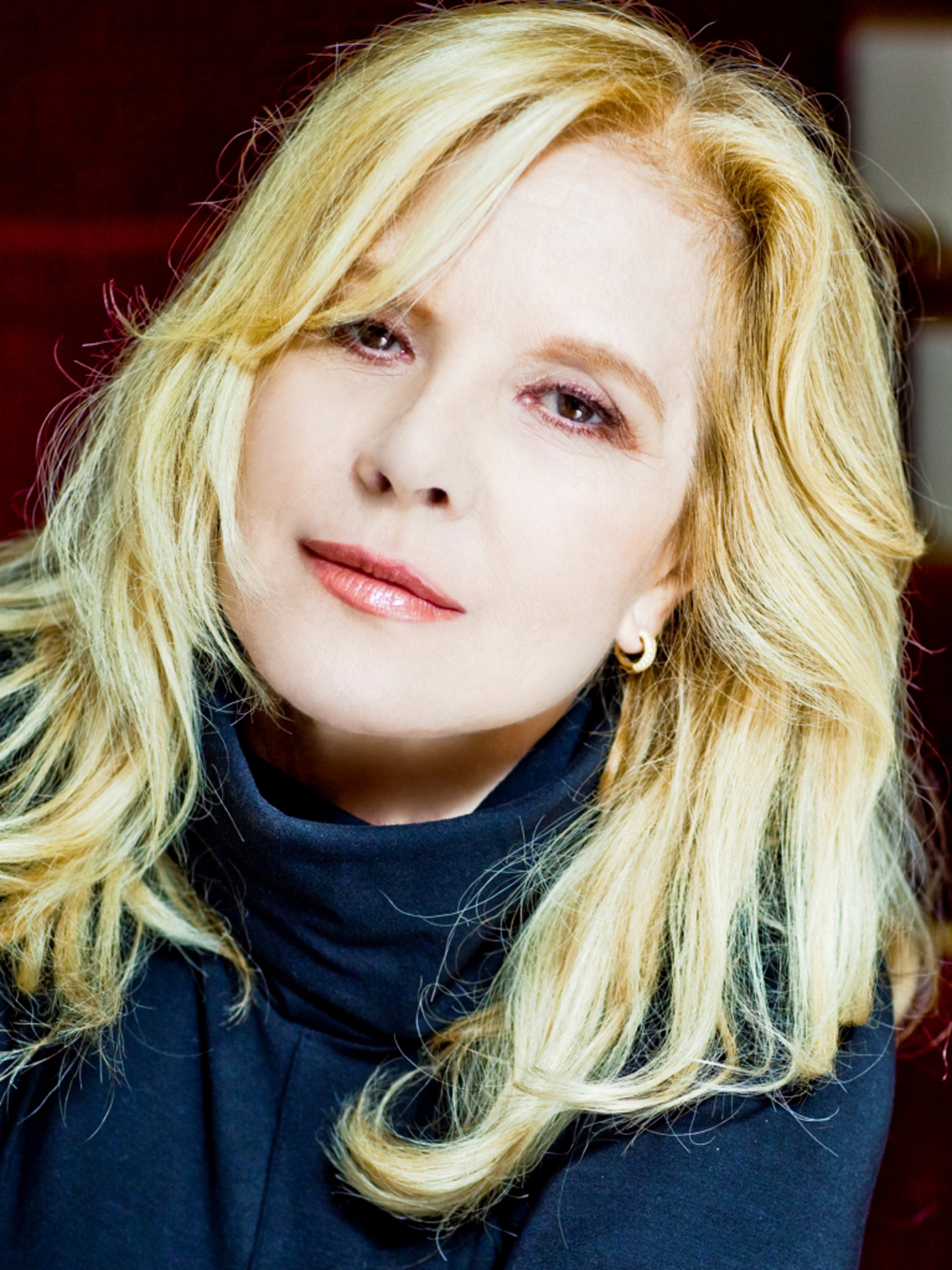
Sylvie Vartan

- Tzvetan Todorov, essayist and historian
- Sylvie Vartan, singer

== Cambodia ==
- Frédéric Chau, actor
- Indila, singer
- Bérénice Marlohe, actress
- Elodie Yung, actress

== Cameroon ==
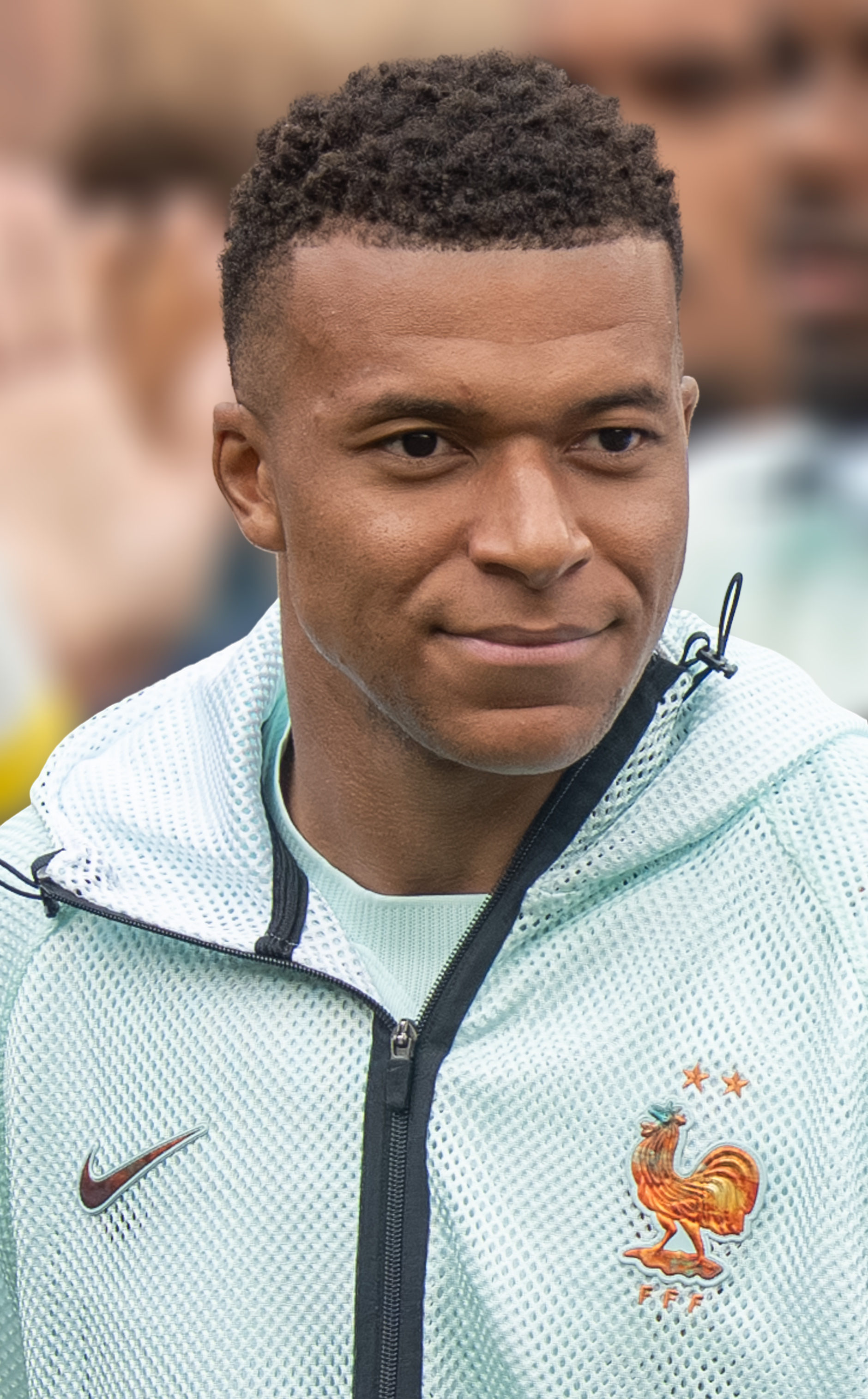
Kylian Mbappé

- Dieudonné, comedian
- Antoinette Nana Djimou, heptathlete and pentathlete
- Kylian Mbappé, footballer
- Yannick Noah, former tennis player and singer
- Alex Song, footballer
- Aurélien Tchouaméni, footballer
- Gaëlle Nayo-Ketchanke, weightlifter
- Dora Tchakounté, weightlifter

== Canada ==
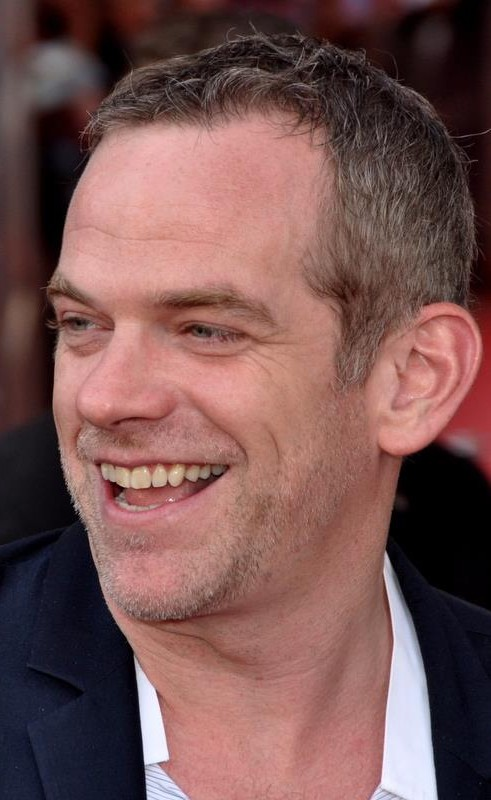
Garou

- Virginie Besson-Silla, film producer
- Deanna Durbin, actress and singer
- Mylène Farmer, singer
- Garou, singer
- Vanessa James, figure skater
- Charlotte Le Bon, actress
- Axelle Lemaire, politician
- Mary Pierce, tennis player
- Natasha St-Pier, singer

== Cape Verde ==
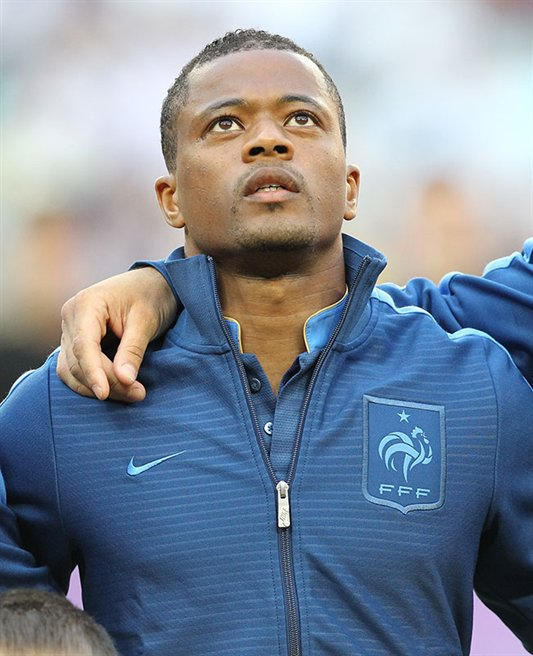
Patrice Evra

- Patrice Evra, footballer
- Lisandro Cuxi, singer
- Sara Martins, actress

== Central Africa Republic ==
- Kurt Zouma, footballer

== Chile ==
- Sergio Coronado, politician
- Jena Lee, singer
- Marisol Touraine, politician

== China ==
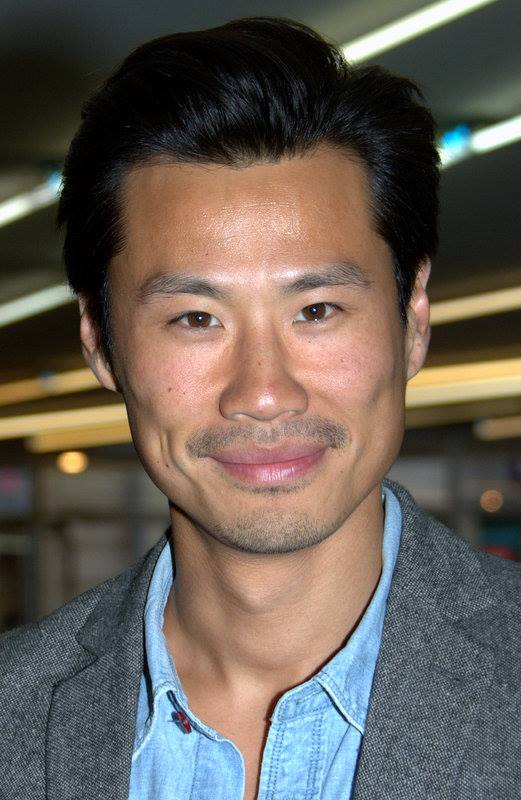
Frédéric Chau

- Frédéric Chau, actor
- Steevy Chong Hue, footballer
- Mylène Jampanoï, actress
- Bérénice Marlohe, actress
- Jean Pasqualini, journalist
- Dai Sijie, author and filmmaker
- Harmony Tan, tennis player
- Gao Xingjian, novelist
- Yiqing Yin, designer
- Jia Nan Yuan, tennis player
- Qi Xuefei, badminton player
- Pi Hongyan, badminton player
- Feng Xiao-min, artist
- Li Xue, table tennis player
- Lucie Zhang, actress
- Fan Hui, Go player

== Comoros ==
- Rohff, rapper
- Soprano, singer
- Isaac Lihadji, footballer
- Arnaud Assoumani, athlete

== Congo, Democratic Republic of the ==
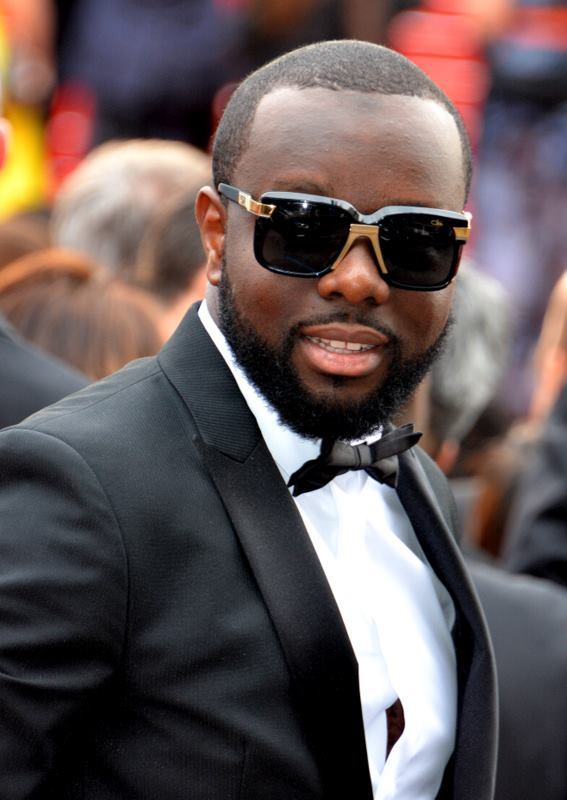
Maître Gims

- Loïc Badiashile, footballer
- Presnel Kimpembe, footballer
- Cheick Kongo, mixed martial artist
- Steve Mandanda, footballer
- Blaise Matuidi, footballer
- Steven Nzonzi, footballer
- Victor Wembanyama, basketball player
- Maître Gims, rapper
- Tony Yoka, boxer
- Eduardo Camavinga, footballer
- Madeleine Malonga, judoka

== Congo, Republic of the ==
- Yann M'Vila, footballer
- Yohan M'Vila, footballer
- Jo-Wilfried Tsonga, tennis player
- Séraphine Okemba, rugby player

== Croatia ==
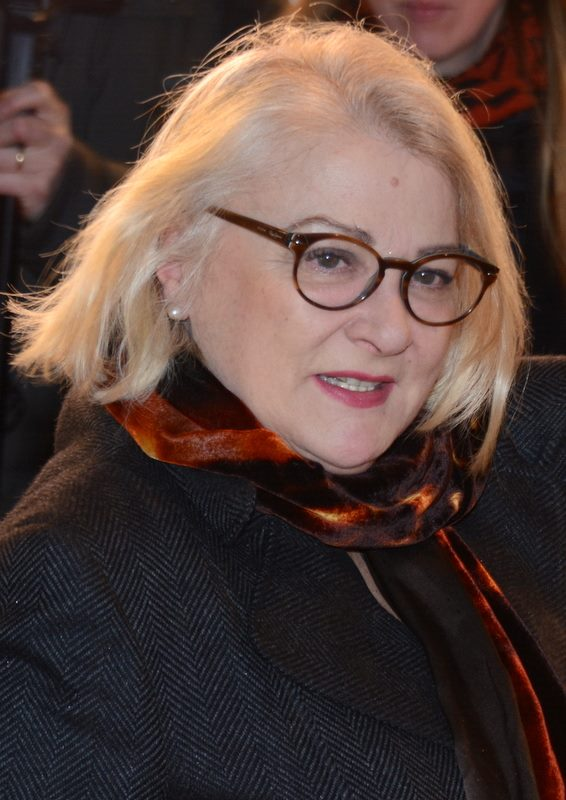
Josiane Belsako

- Josiane Balasko, actress
- Emmanuelle Béart, actress
- Tamara Horacek, handball player
- Nikola Karabatić, handball player
- Marko Muslin, football player
- Grégory Sertic, football player
- Adrien Thomasson, football player

== Cuba ==
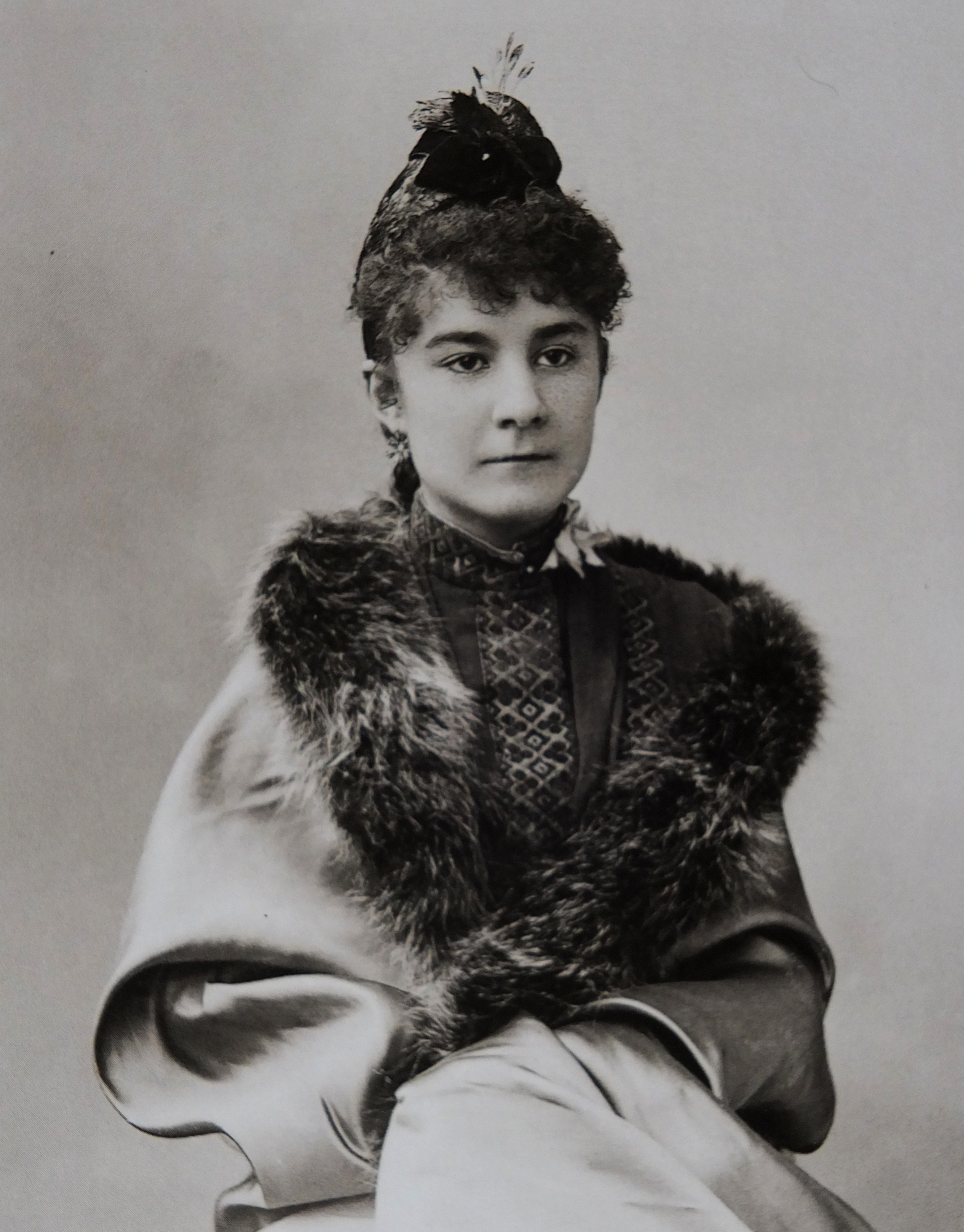
Marie de Régnier

- Chocolat, clown
- José-Maria de Heredia, poet
- Anaïs Nin, writer and novelist
- Marie de Régnier, poet

== Cyprus ==
- Diam's, singer

== Denmark ==
- Anna Karina, actress
- Ingeborg of Denmark, queen of France in 1193

== Egypt ==
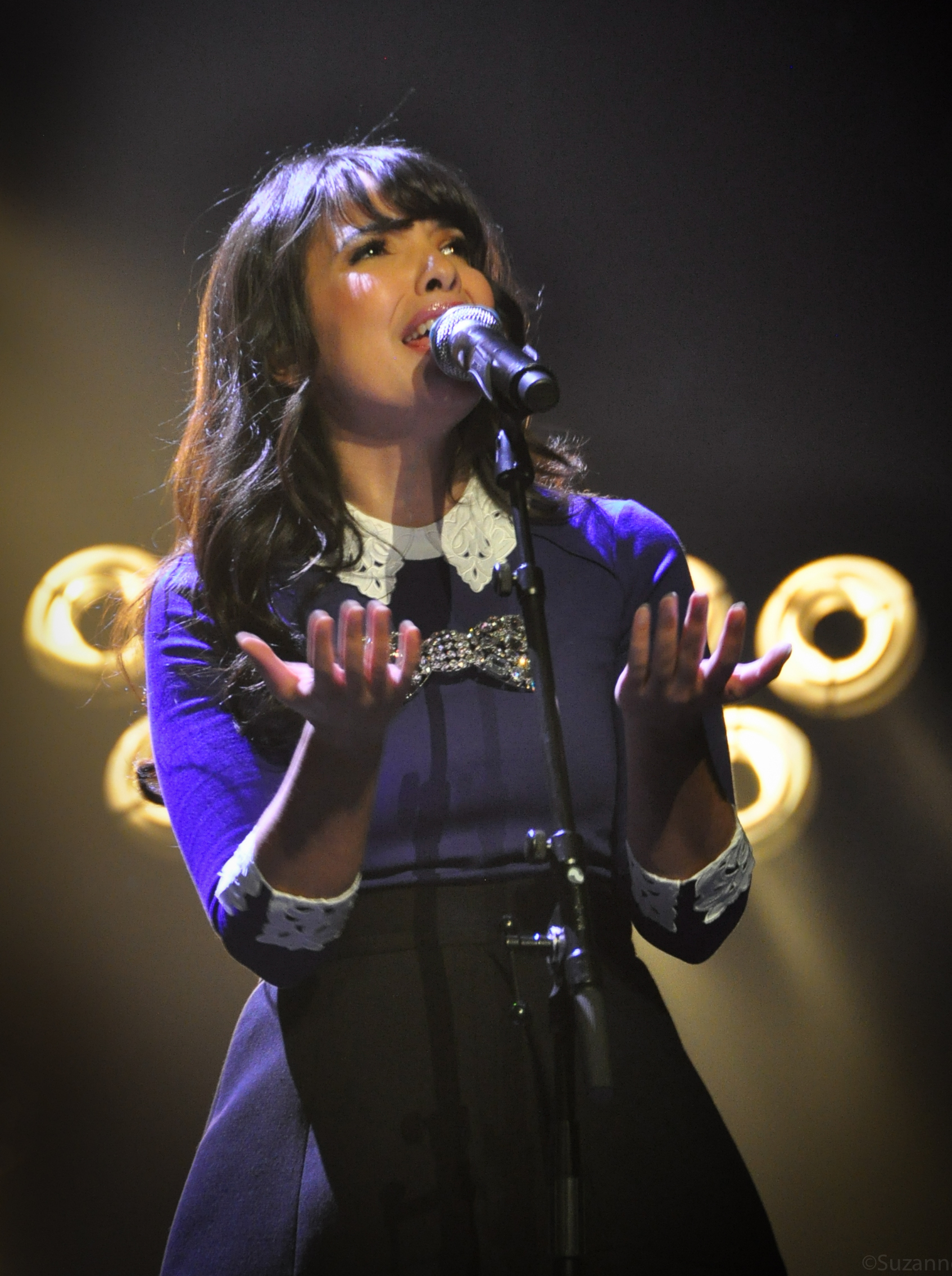
Indila

- Richard Anthony, singer
- Guy Béart, author, composer and performer
- Emmanuelle Béart, actress
- Andrée Chedid, poet and novelist
- Louis Chedid, singer
- Matthieu Chedid, author, composer, and rock performer
- Indila, singer
- Nagui, TV and radio personality

== Fiji ==
- Alivereti Raka, rugby player
- Virimi Vakatawa, rugby player

== Gabon ==
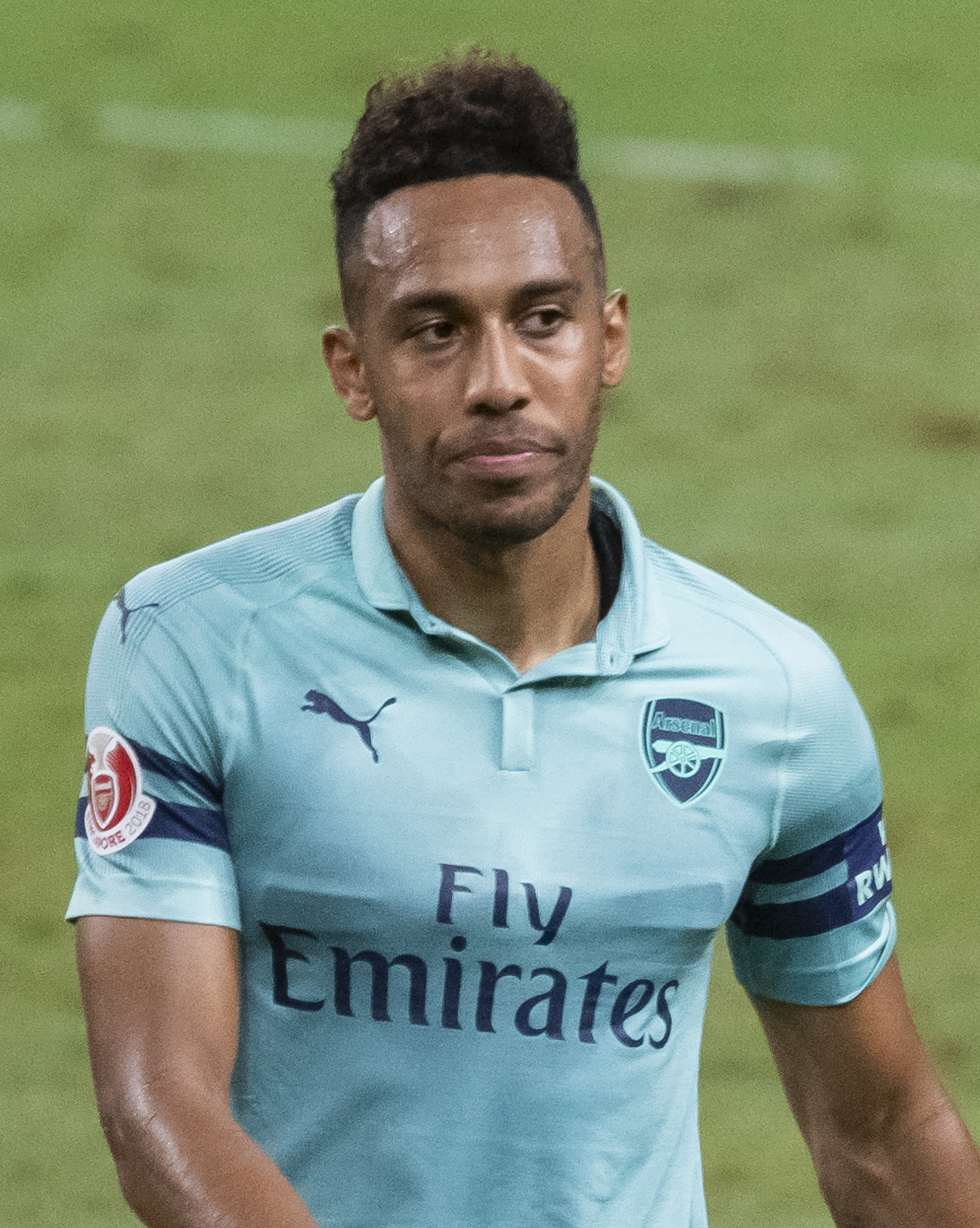
Pierre-Emerick Aubameyang

- Estelle Nze Minko, handball player
- Orlann Ombissa-Dzangue, sprinter
- Pierre-Emerick Aubameyang, footballer
- Danièle Obono, politician
- Owanto, artist

== Georgia ==
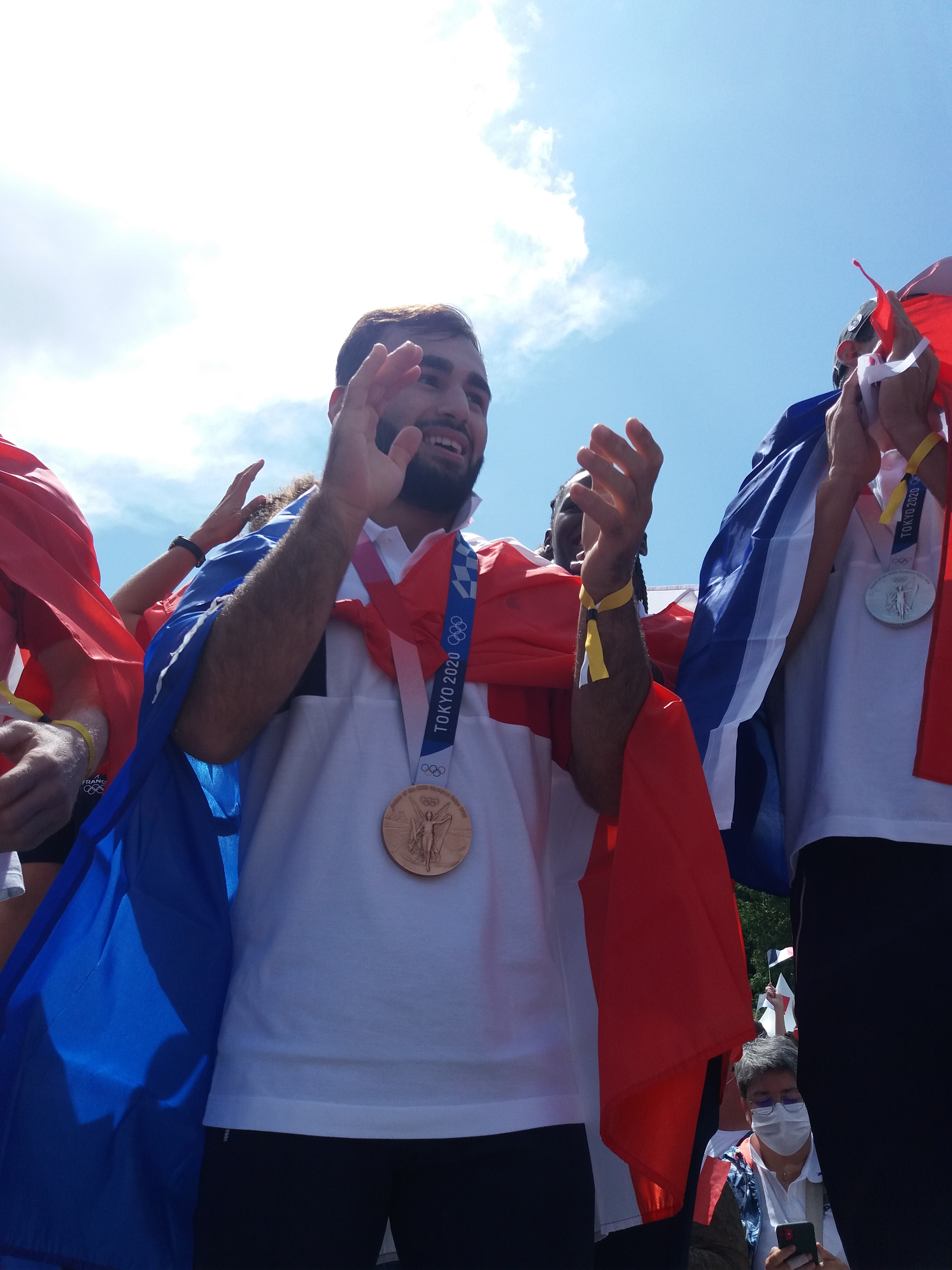
Luka Mkheidze

- Dimitri Amilakhvari, colonel of French army
- Mamuka Gorgodze, rugby player
- Victoria Ravva, volleyball player
- Nino Maisuradze, chess player
- Tornike Gordadze, scientist
- Géla Babluani, film director
- Luka Mkheidze, judoka

== Germany ==
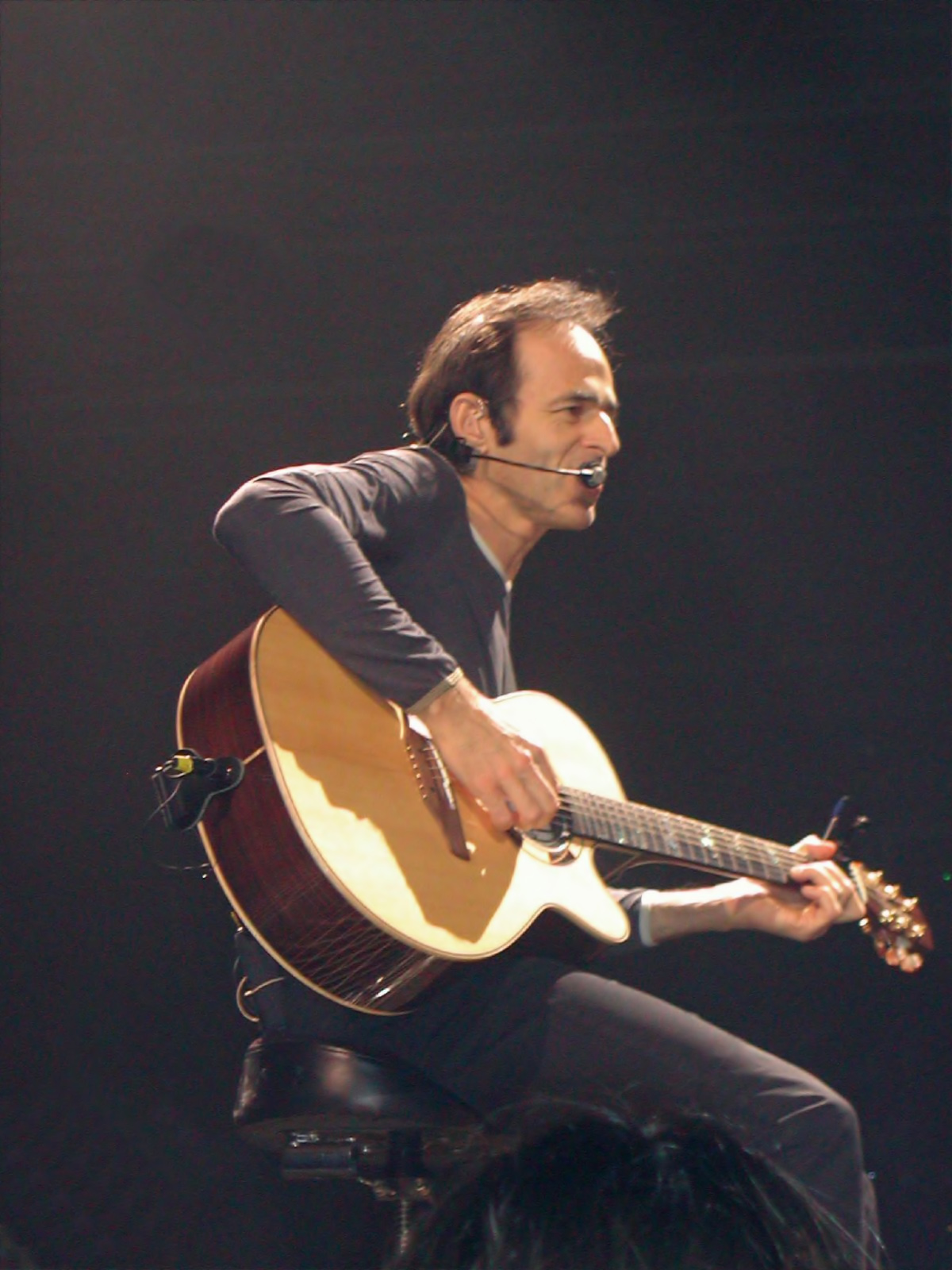
Jean-Jacques Goldman

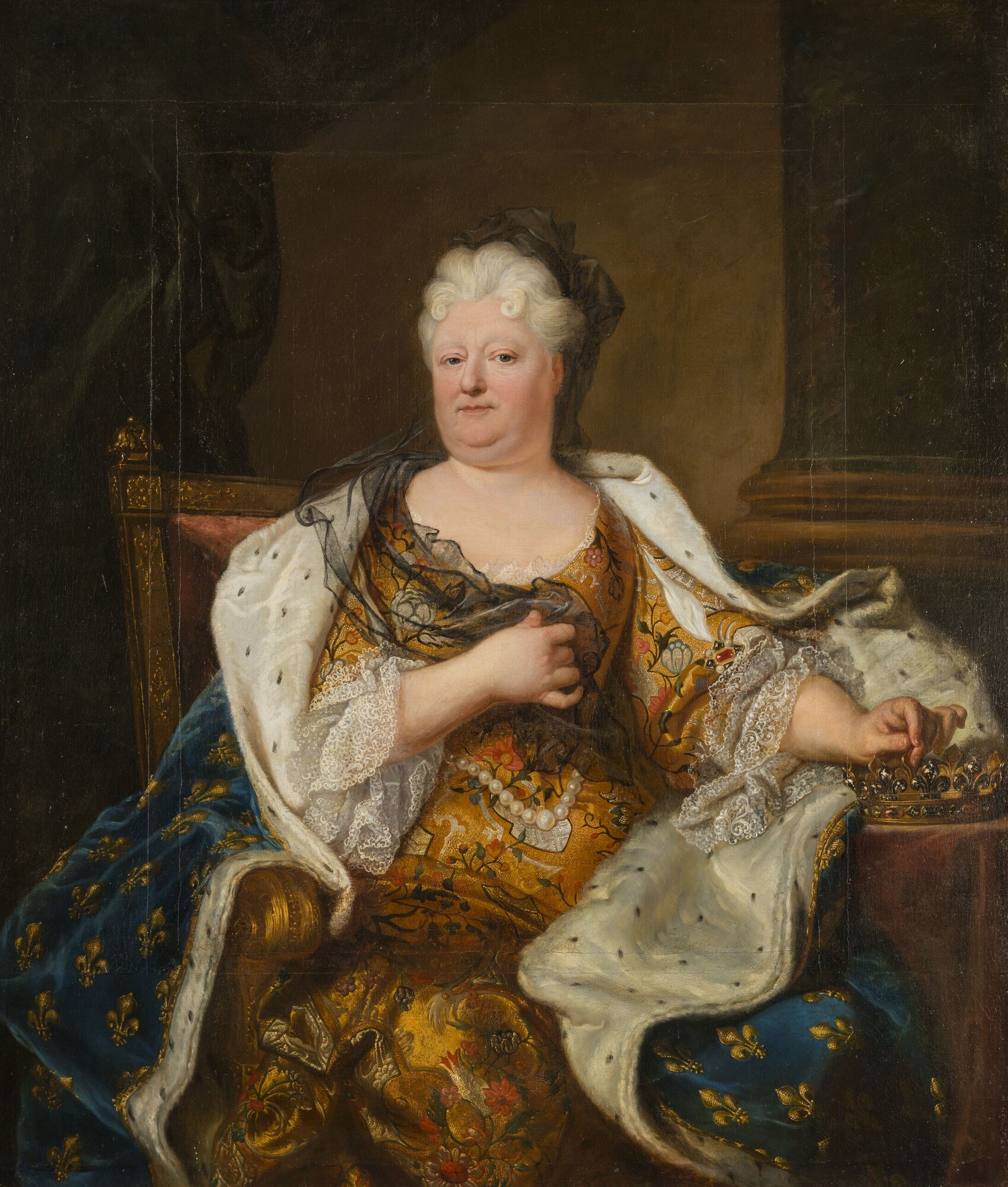
Madame Palatine

- Isabelle Adjani, actress
- Margravine Johanna of Baden-Baden, princess
- Anne Henriette of Bavaria, princess
- Isabeau of Bavaria, queen of France from 1385 until 1422
- Maria Anna Victoria of Bavaria, dauphine of France
- Sophie Charlotte of Bavaria, duchess consort of Alençon
- Daniel Cohn-Bendit, politician
- Laurent Fabius, politician
- Claire Feuerstein, tennis player
- Marina Foïs, actress
- Jean-Jacques Goldman, singer
- Antoine Griezmann, footballer
- Robert Guédiguian, film director
- Adèle Haenel, actress
- Stéphane Hessel, diplomat, writer
- SCH, rapper
- Patricia Kaas, singer
- Gérard Lenorman, singer
- Louane, singer
- Helene of Mecklenburg-Schwerin, Crown Princess
- Jacques Offenbach, composer and cellist
- Edward, Count Palatine of Simmern, count
- Elizabeth Charlotte, Madame Palatine, princess
- Louise Hollandine of the Palatinate, princess, abbess and painter
- Victoria of Saxe-Coburg and Gotha, princess
- Gerberga of Saxony, queen of France from 939 to 954
- Romy Schneider, actress
- Albert Schweitzer, theologian, organist and writer
- Gertrude Stein, novelist, poet and playwright
- Wendelin Werner, mathematician

== Greece ==
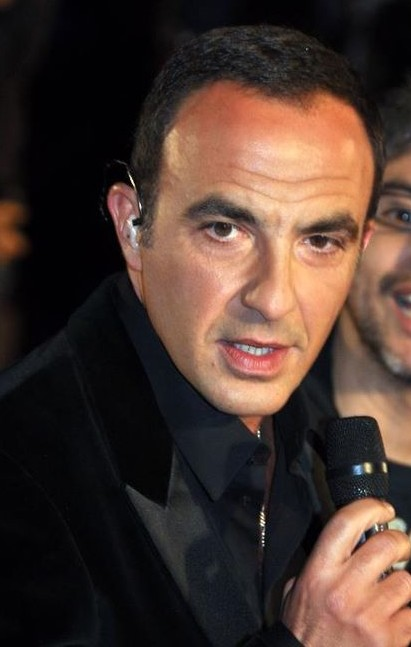
Nikos Aliagas

- Vassilis Alexakis, writer
- Nikos Aliagas, talk show host, singer
- Maria Callas, soprano
- Diam's, singer
- Adele Exarchopoulos, actress
- Georges Guétary, singer and dancer
- Gilles Marini, actor
- Georges Moustaki, singer
- Jean Moréas, poet
- Gabriella Papadakis, figure skater
- Agnès Varda, film director
- Iannis Xenakis, composer

== Guinea ==
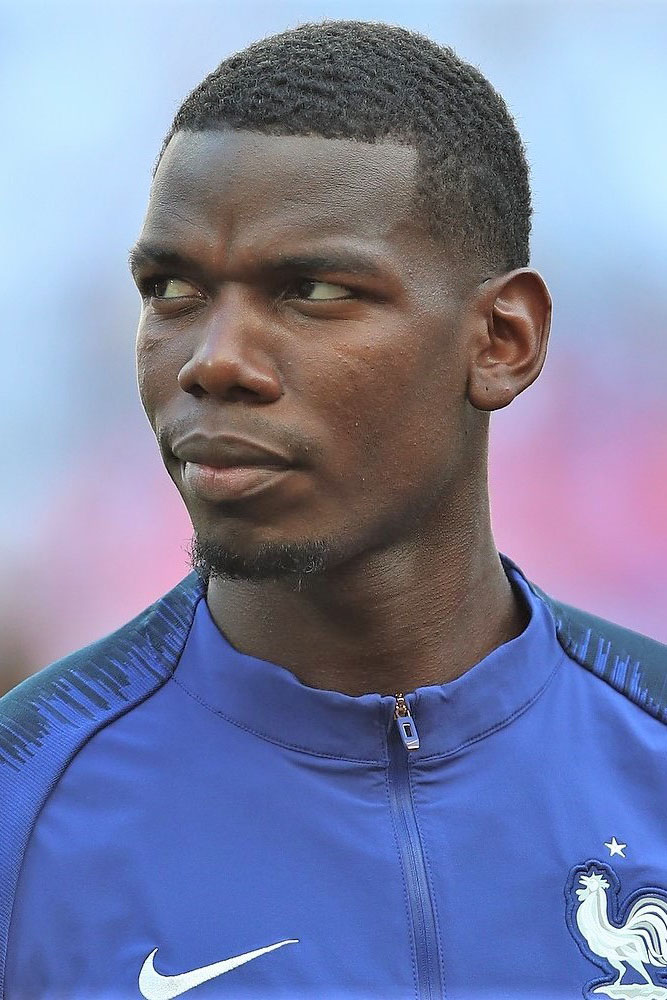
Paul Pogba

- Black M, rapper
- Mohamed Sylla, rapper
- Paul Pogba, footballer

== Haiti ==
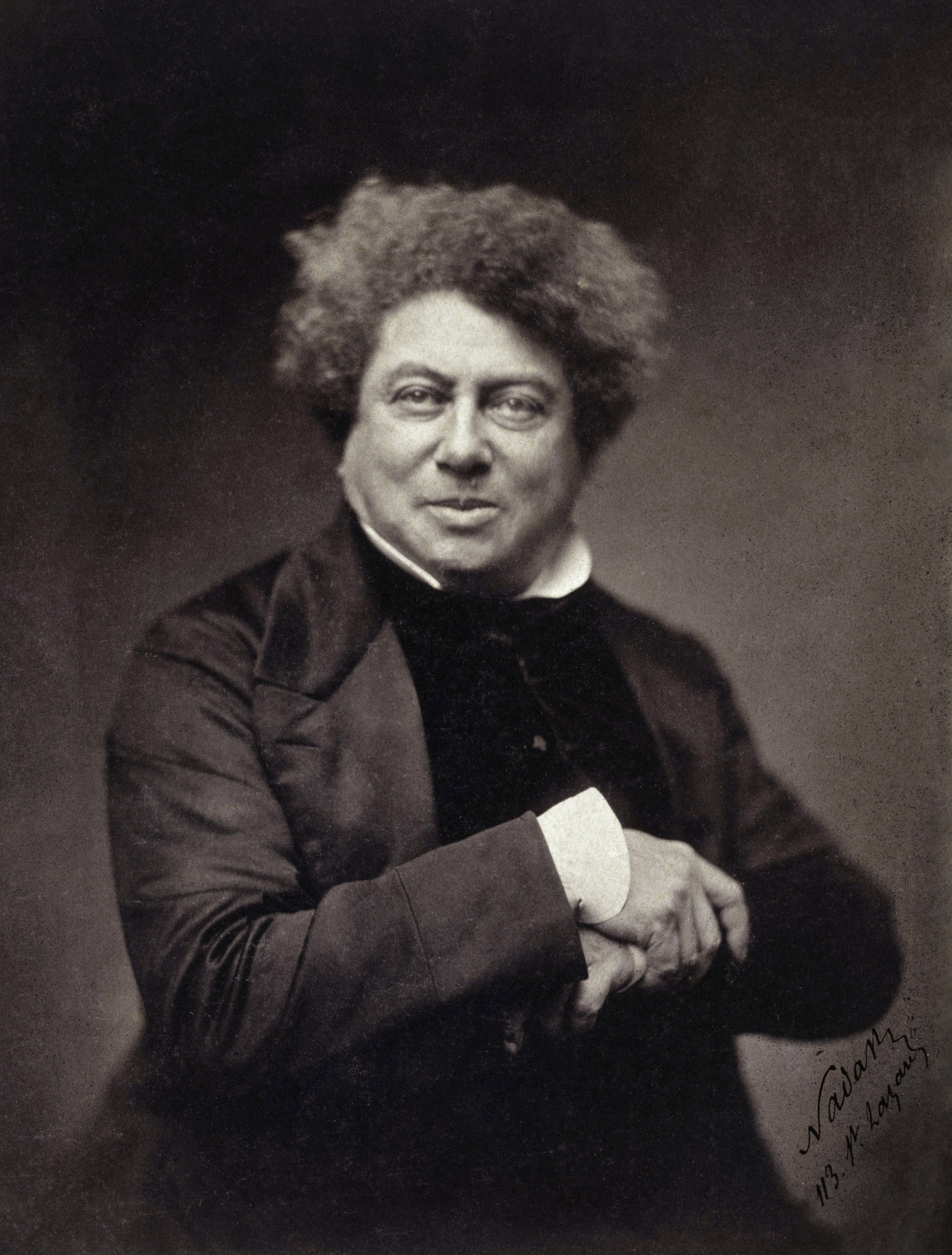
Alexandre Dumas

- Edgar Degas, artist
- Alexandre Dumas, writer
- Thomas-Alexandre Dumas, general
- Wagneau Eloi, football player
- Kery James, rapper
- Presnel Kimpembe, footballer
- Toussaint Louverture, leader of Haitian Revolution
- Johny Placide, football player
- Charles Terres Weymann, aeroplane racing pilot

== Hungary ==
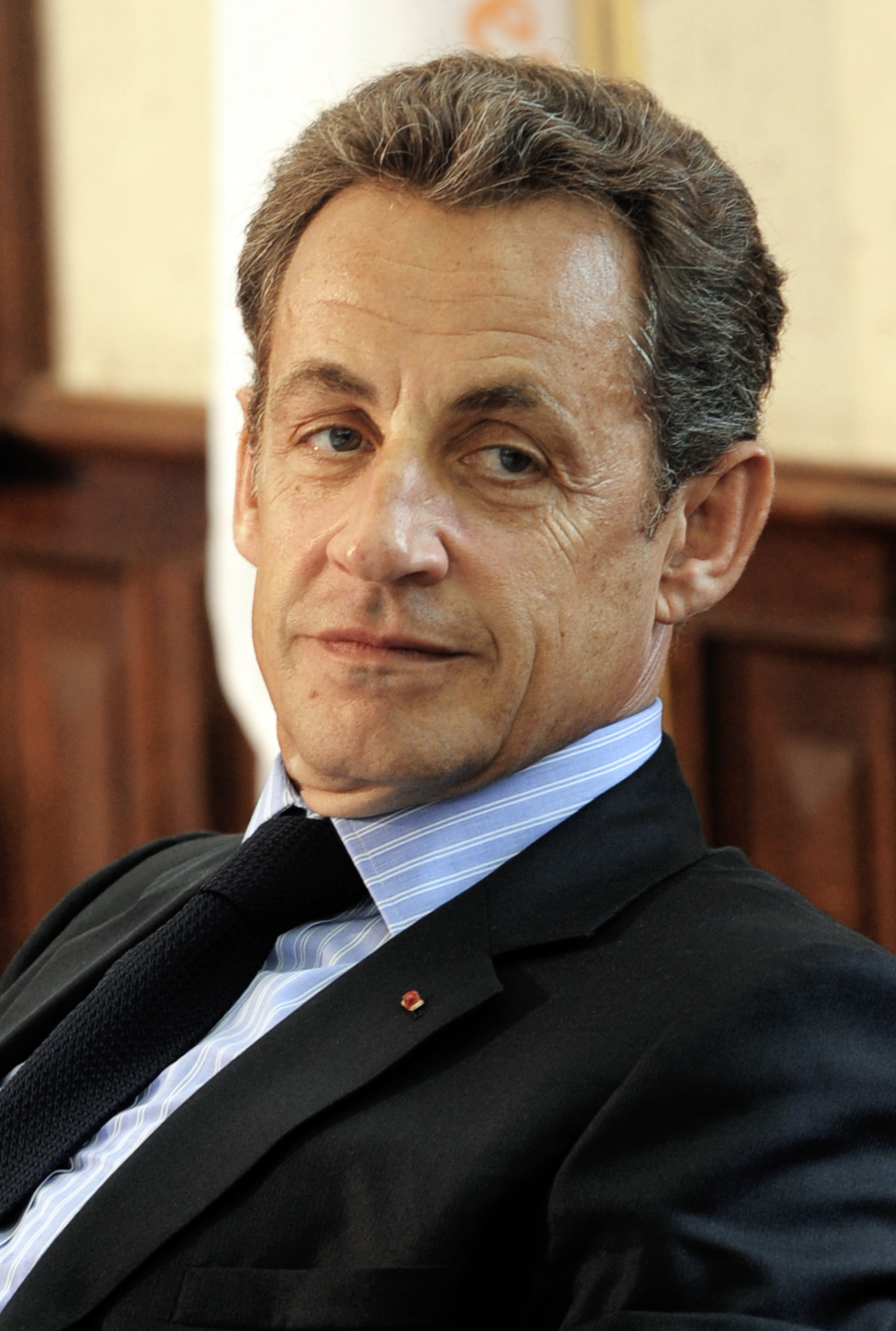
Nicolas Sarkozy

- Lorànt Deutsch, actor and writer
- Clementia of Hungary, queen of France from 1315 until 1316
- Mathieu Kassovitz, film director
- Nicolas Sarkozy, French president
- Sylvie Vartan, singer

== India ==
- Indila, singer
- Rudgy Pajany, singer
- J. R. D. Tata, aviator
- Prithika Pavade, table tennis player
- Shumona Sinha, writer

== Indonesia ==
- Anggun, singer

== Iran ==
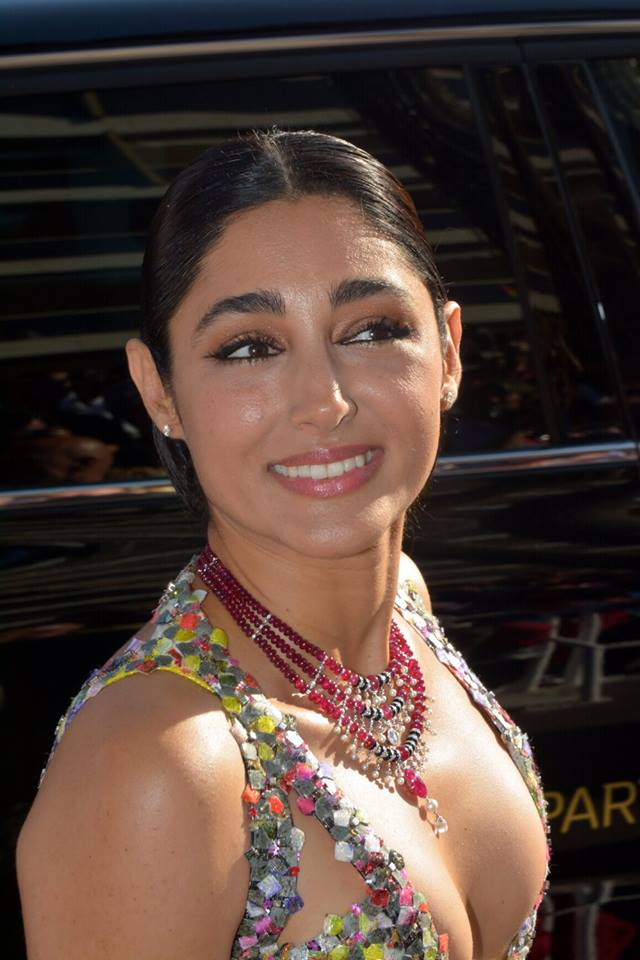
Golshifteh Farahani

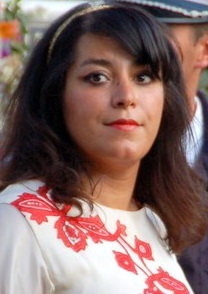
Marjane Satrapi

- Fariba Adelkhah, anthropologist; imprisoned in Iran from 2019 until 2023.
- Mahshid Amirshahi, novelist, humorist, and translator
- Shéhérazade Semsar-de Boisséson, executive
- Zahra Amir Ebrahimi, photographer, television actress, sentenced to 6 months in prison and 90 lashes in Iran
- Soraya Esfandiary-Bakhtiary, queen of Iran from 1951 until 1958
- Golshifteh Farahani, actress
- Alireza Firouzja, chess player
- Robert Hossein, actor, filmmaker
- Marjan Kalhor, Olympic alpine skier
- Maryam Rajavi, president of the National Council of Resistance of Iran
- Yasmina Reza, filmmaker
- Aravane Rezaï, tennis player
- Marjane Satrapi, cartoonist and film director
- Nasrine Seraji, architect
- Mahasti Shahrokhi, poet, novelist

== Israel ==
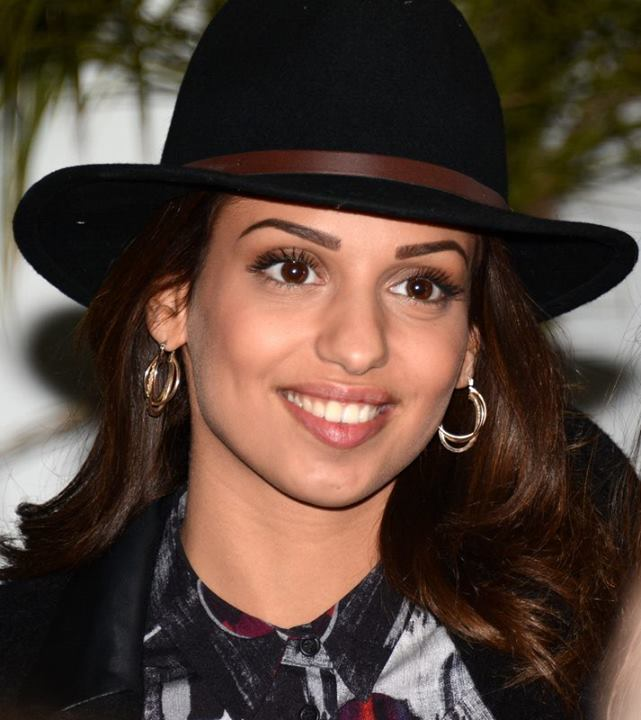
Tal

- Tal, singer
- Arcadi Gaydamak, businessman and philanthropist
- Alexandre Gaydamak, businessman
- Ruth Westheimer, sex therapist and talk show host

== Italy ==
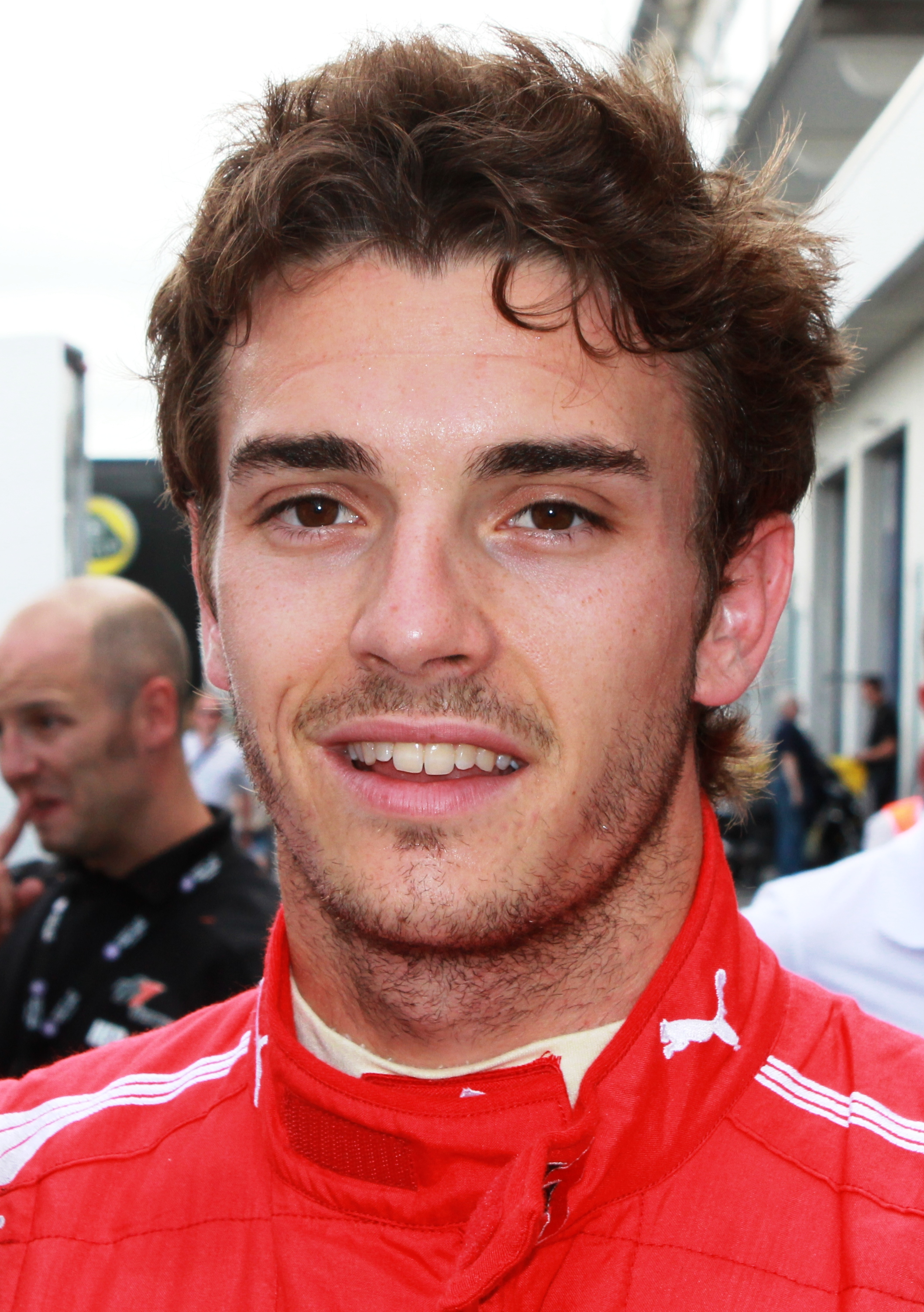
Jules Bianchi

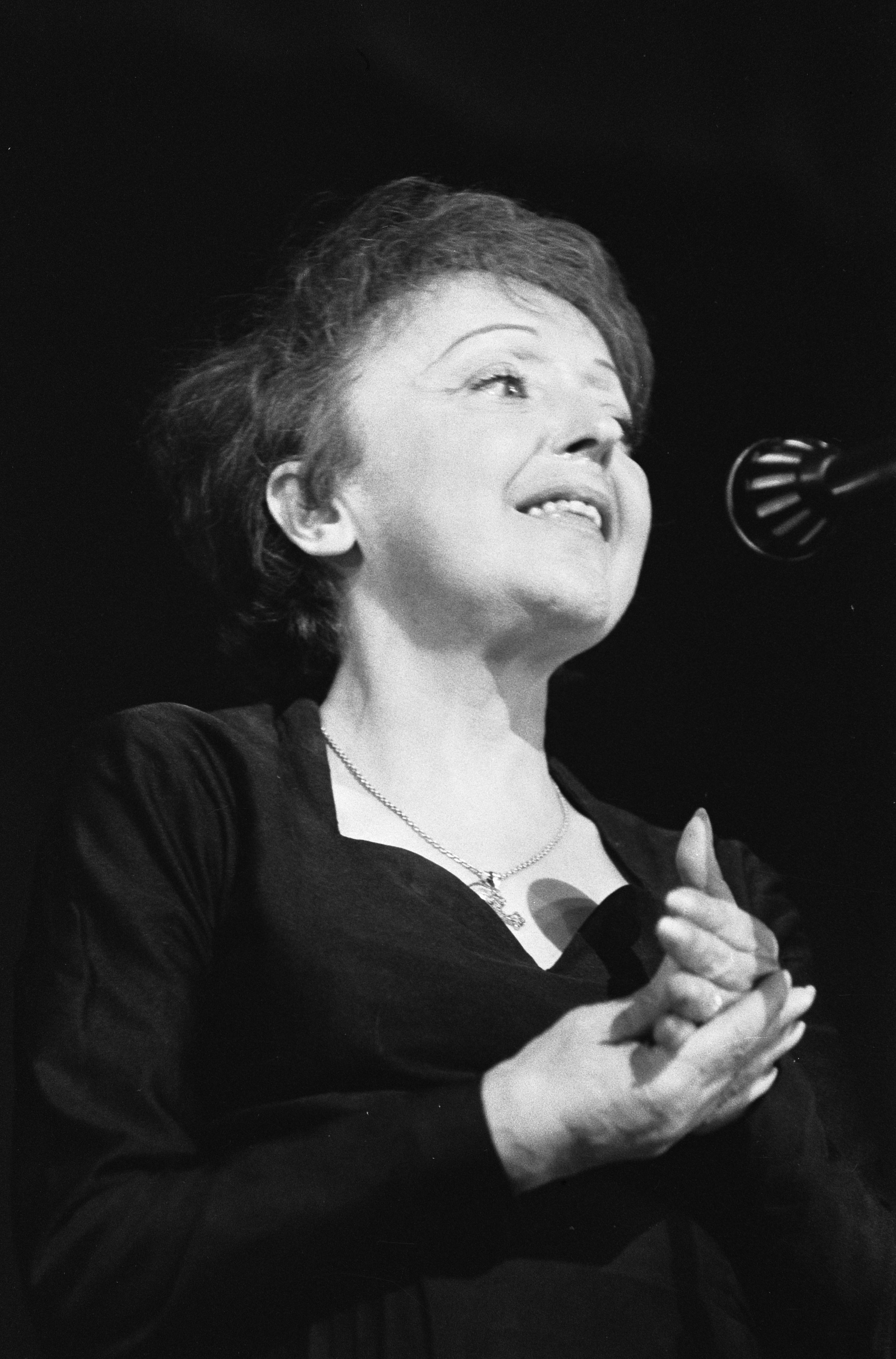
Edith Piaf

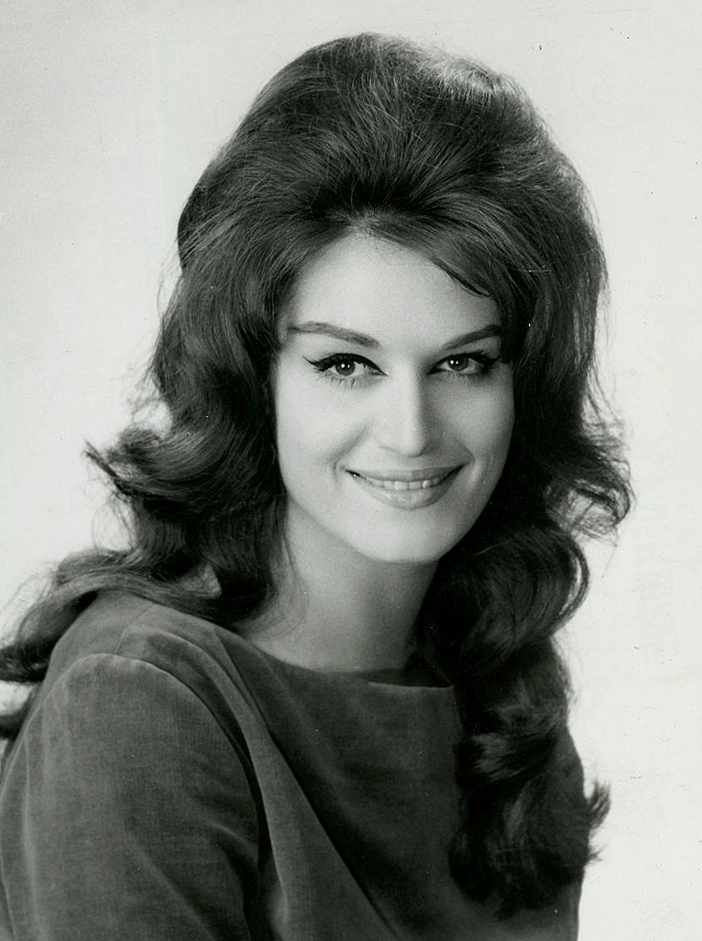
Dalida

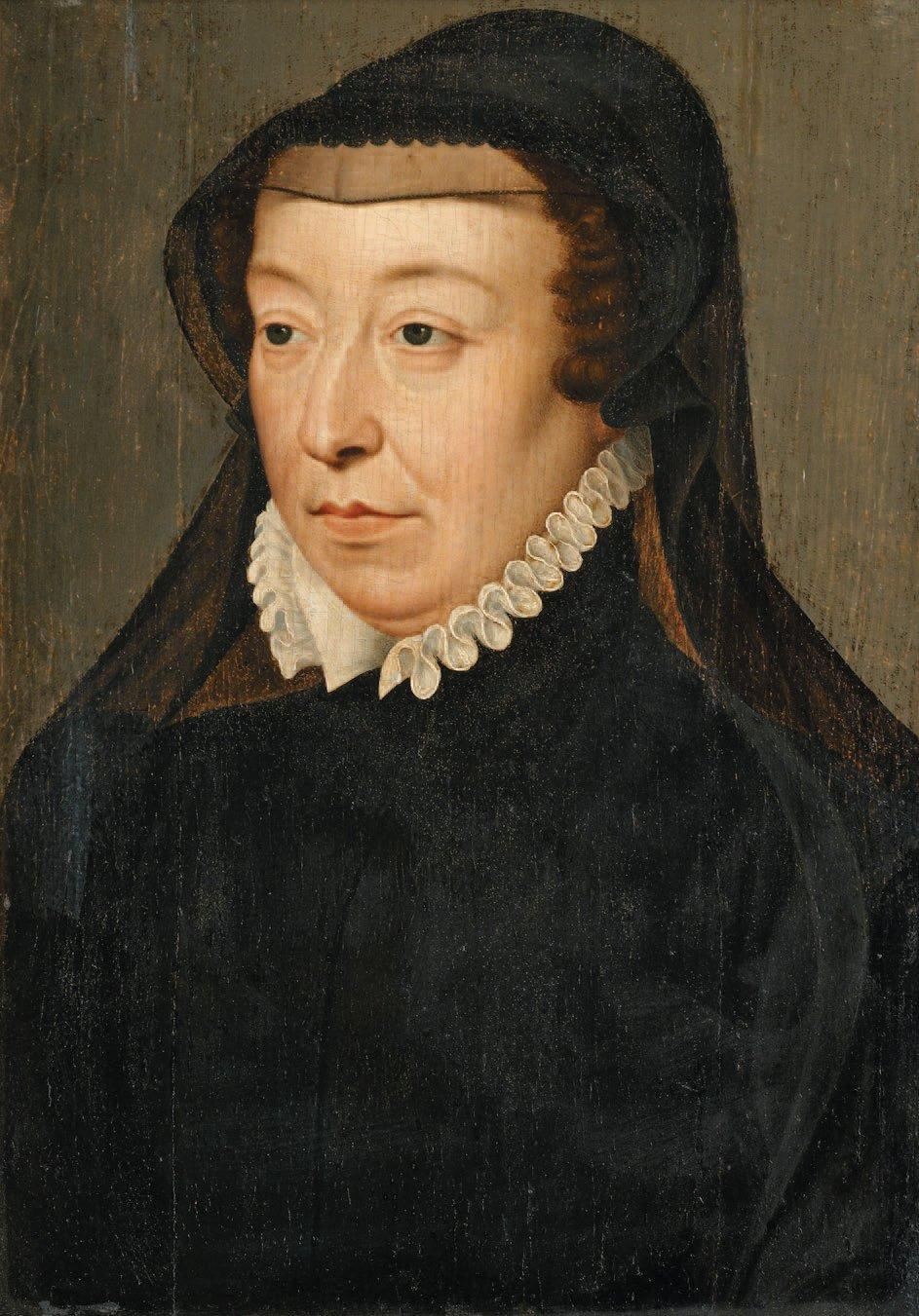
Catherine de'Medici

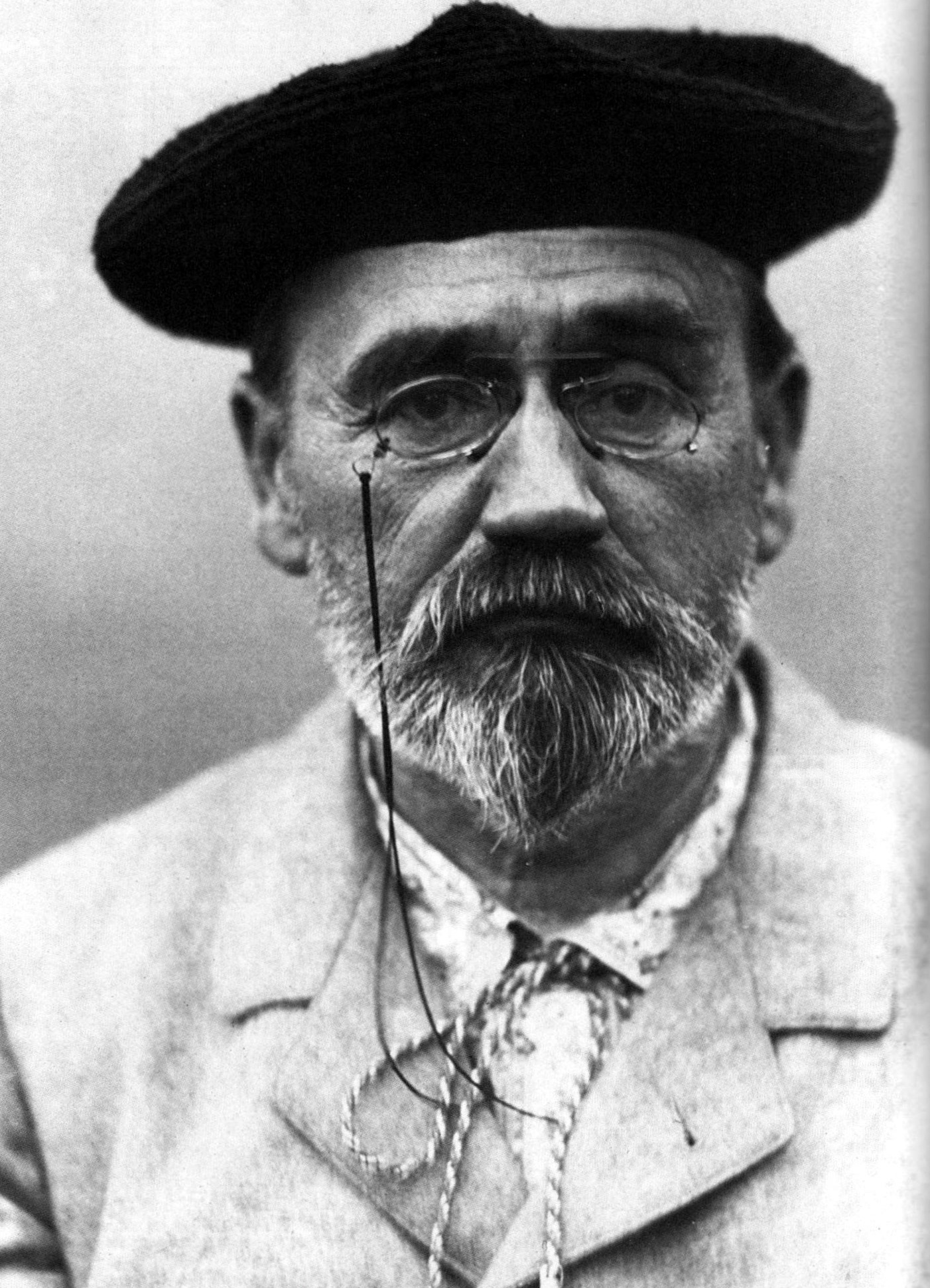
Emile Zola

- Roberto Alagna, tenor
- Jean Alesi, racing driver
- Jordan Bardella, politician
- Claude Bartolone, President of the National Assembly
- Jean-Paul Belmondo, actor
- Jules Bianchi, motor racing driver
- Caroline Bonaparte, sister of Napoleon and queen of Naples from 1808 to 1815
- Elisa Bonaparte, sister of Napoleon and duchess of Toscany from 1809 to 1814
- Jérôme Bonaparte, brother of Napoleon and king of Westphalia from 1807 to 1813
- Joseph Bonaparte, brother of Napoleon and king of Spain from 1808 to 1813
- Letizia Bonaparte, noblewoman and mother of Napoleon
- Louis Bonaparte, brother of Napoleon and king of Holland from 1806 to 1810
- Lucien Bonaparte, brother of Napoleon
- Pauline Bonaparte, sister of Napoleon and duchess of Guastalla in 1806
- Napoleon Bonaparte, statesman and military leader
- Maria Carolina of Bourbon Two-Sicilies, princess
- Georges Brassens, singer
- Carla Bruni, singer and ex-First Lady of France
- Carlo Buonaparte, lawyer, diplomat and father of Napoleon
- Calogero, singer
- Laetitia Casta, actress and model
- François Cavanna, writer
- Francis Cabrel, singer
- Lorenzo Callegari, football player
- Philippe Candeloro, patineur
- Eric Cantona, actor and footballer
- Concino Concini, politician
- Nicolas Cozza, football player
- Dalida, singer
- Edgar Degas, artist
- Leonora Dori, courtier
- Maria Teresa Felicitas d'Este, princess
- Laurence Ferrari, journalist
- Léo Ferré, singer
- Aurélie Filippetti, Minister of Culture and Communication
- Geneviève Fioraso, Minister of Higher Education and Research
- Marina Foïs, actress
- Florence Foresti, comedian and actress
- Raymond Forni, politician
- Claude François, singer
- Joseph Gallieni, marshal of France
- Max Gallo, writer and historian
- Léon Gambetta, politician and statesman
- Emma of Italy, queen of France from 965 until 986
- Rozala of Italy, queen of France from 988 until 996
- Fabrice Luchini, actor
- Jean-Baptiste Lully, composer
- Elsa Lunghini, singer
- Gilles Marini, actor
- Anne Marie Martinozzi, aristocrat
- Chiara Mastroianni, actress
- Cardinal Mazarin, cardinal, diplomat and politician
- Catherine de'Medici, queen of France from 1547 until 1559
- Marie de' Medici, queen of France from 1600 until 1610
- Amedeo Modigliani, painter
- Yves Montand (Ivo Livi), actor
- Maria Amalia of Naples and Sicily, queen of France from 1830 until 1848
- Edith Piaf, singer
- Michel Platini, football administrator and former player
- Marie Adélaïde of Savoy, dauphine of France
- Hélène Ségara, actress
- Sylvie Testud, actress
- Albert Uderzo, writer, humorist and cartoonist, creator of Asterix
- Valentina Visconti, duchess consort of Orléans
- Mario Zatelli, footballer
- Émile Zola, writer

== Ivory Coast ==
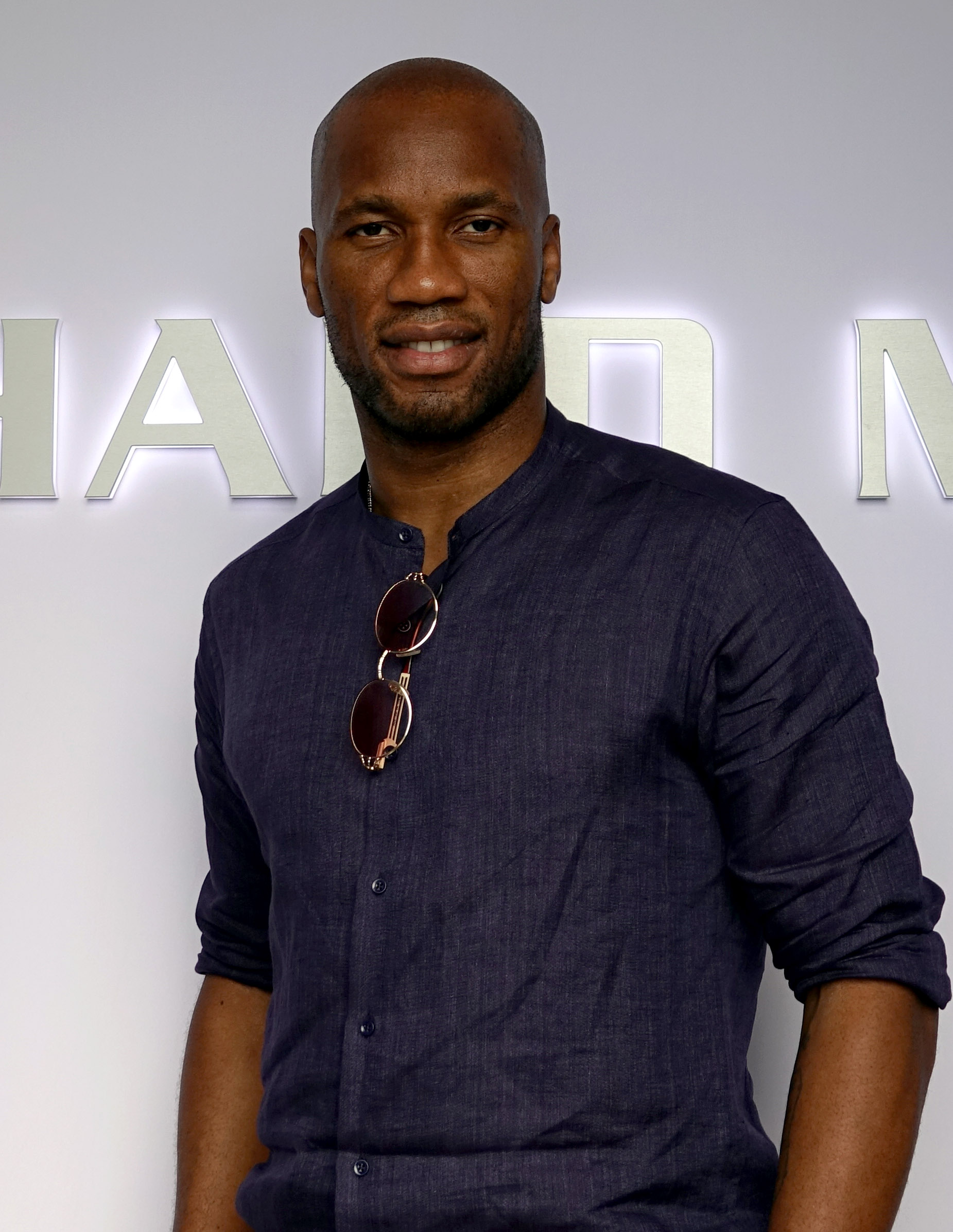
Didier Drogba

- Basile Boli, footballer
- Jean-Daniel Akpa Akpro, footballer
- Isabelle Boni-Claverie, author, screenwriter, and director
- Grégory Choplin, kickboxer
- Marie-Laure Delie, footballer
- Didier Drogba, footballer
- Kaaris, rapper
- Cédric Kipré, footballer
- Maé-Bérénice Méité, figure skater
- Véronique Tadjo, writer
- Charles-Antoine Kouakou, athlete

== Jamaica ==
- Zita Hanrot, actress

== Japan ==
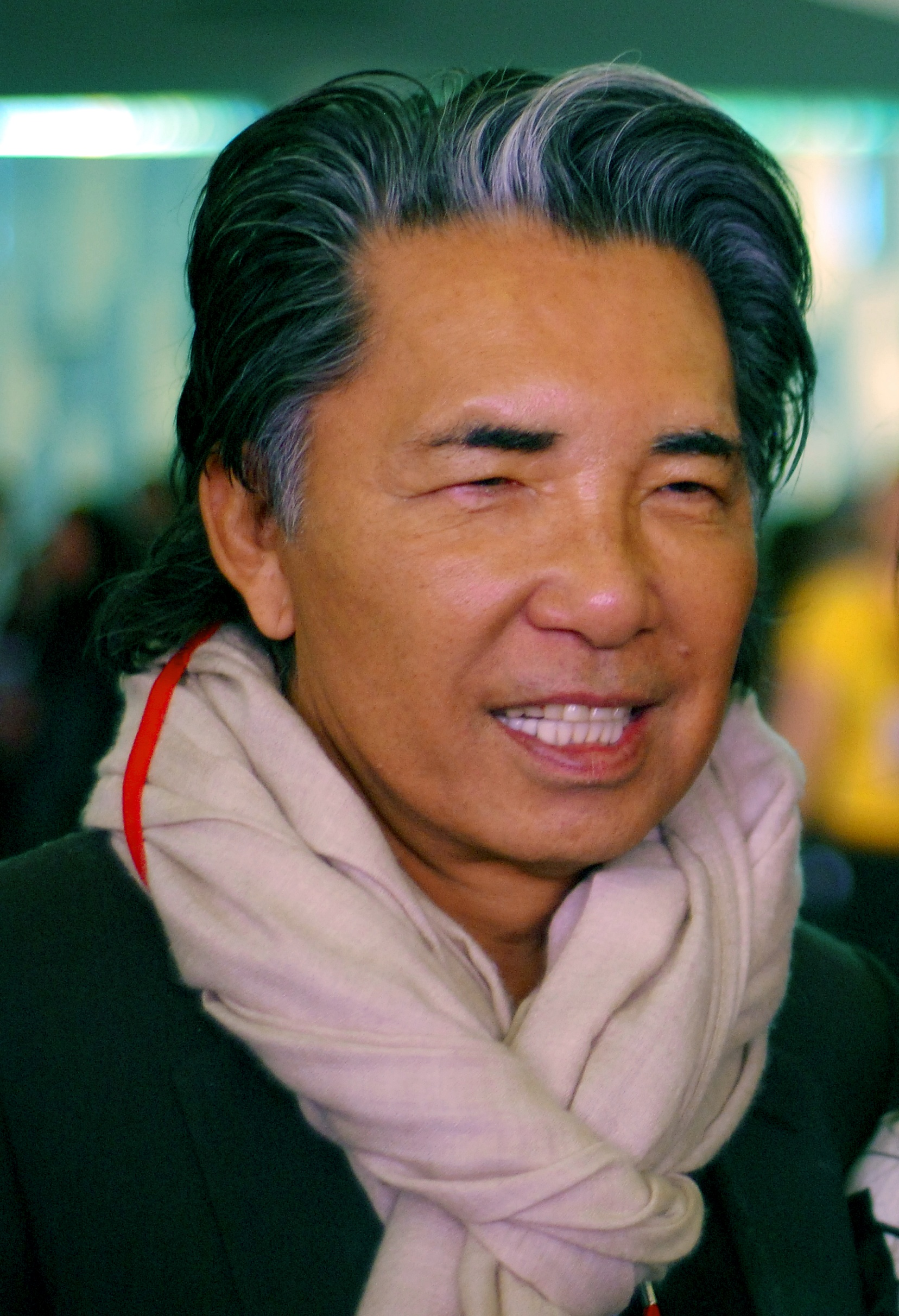
Kenzo Takada

- Kenzō Takada, designer
- Megumi Satsu, singer
- Morio Matsui, artist
- Uffie, singer

== Kenya ==
- Susan Jeptooo Kipsang, athlete
- Simon Munyutu, athlete

== Laos ==
- Thu Kamkasomphou, table tennis player
- Anousone Prasitharath, footballer
- Kayane, e-sports player
- Billy Ketkeophomphone, footballer

== Lebanon ==
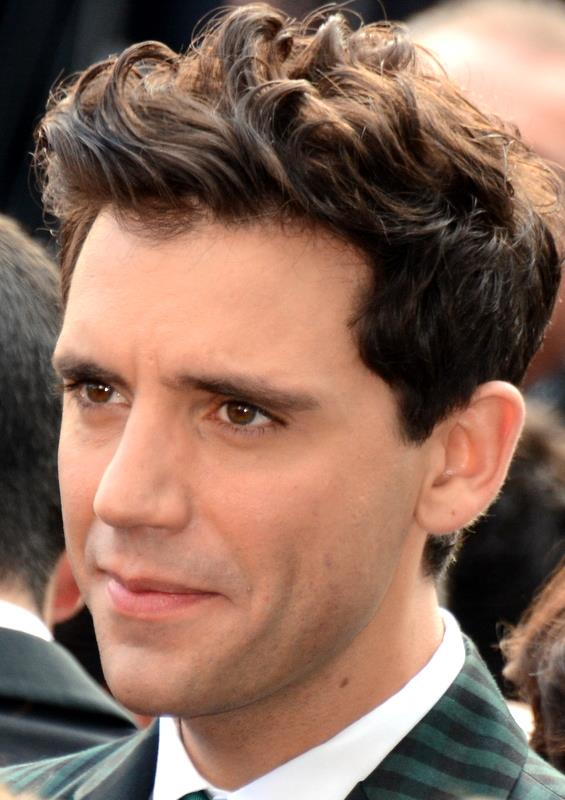
Mika

- Louis Chedid, singer, songwriter
- Matthieu Chedid, aka -M-, rock guitarist
- Gilbert Collard, writer, barrister and politician; one of his great grandfathers, Fatallah Tarrazi, was from Lebanon
- Carlos Ghosn, chairman and CEO of Renault-Nissan-Mitsubishi alliance
- Eid Hourany, nuclear physicist
- Antoine Karam, politician, President of the Regional Council of French Guiana
- Vénus Khoury-Ghata, writer, poet
- Antoine Lahad, Lebanese Army Major General, and subsequently leader of the South Lebanon Army
- Thomas Langmann, film producer, actor of Lebanese Jewish descent
- Amin Maalouf, author, novelist
- Ibrahim Maalouf, musician, trumpet player, composer
- Pierre-Antoine Melki, aka Nius, music producer
- Mika, singer based in UK.
- William Saliba, footballer

== Lithuania ==
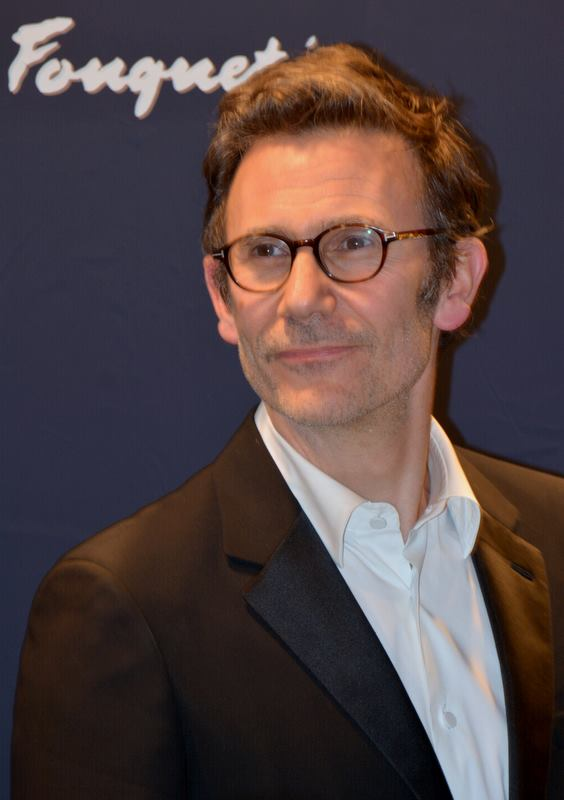
Michel Hazanavicius

- Joseph Kessel, writer
- Emmanuel Levinas, philosopher
- Michel Hazanavicius, film director

== Mali ==
- N'Golo Kanté, footballer
- Aya Nakamura, singer
- Alassane Pléa, footballer
- Djibril Sidibé, footballer
- Moussa Sissoko, footballer
- Siraba Dembélé Pavlović, handball player

== Mauritius ==
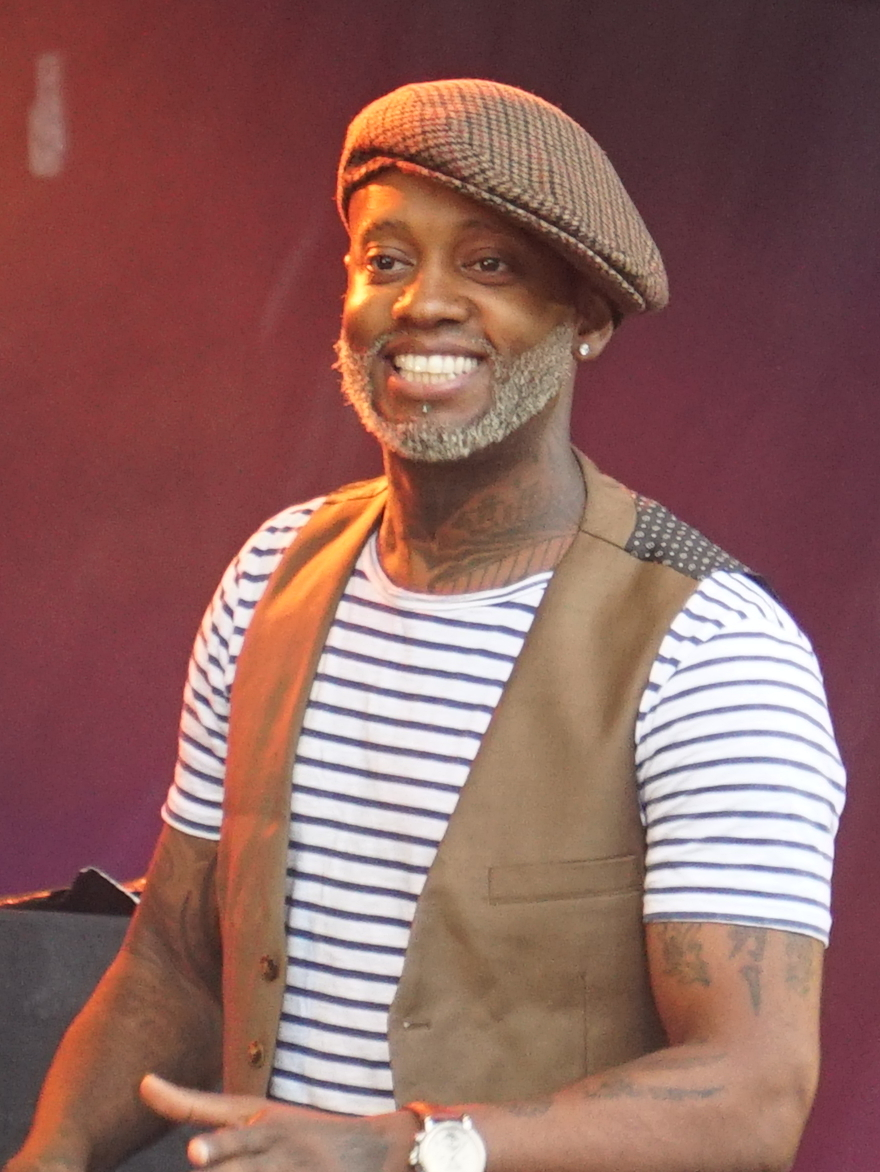
Willy William

- Vikash Dhorasoo, footballer
- Henri Le Sidaner, painter
- Alix d'Unienville, spy
- Willy William, singer
- Adam Siao Him Fa, figure skater

== Mexico ==
- Carlos de Beistegui, art collector and decorator
- Dominique Fernandez, writer
- Adan Jodorowsky, actor and musician
- Porfirio Díaz, 29th President of Mexico

== Moldova ==
- Cécilia Attias, second wife of Nicolas Sarkozy
- Almira Skripchenko, chess player

== Morocco ==
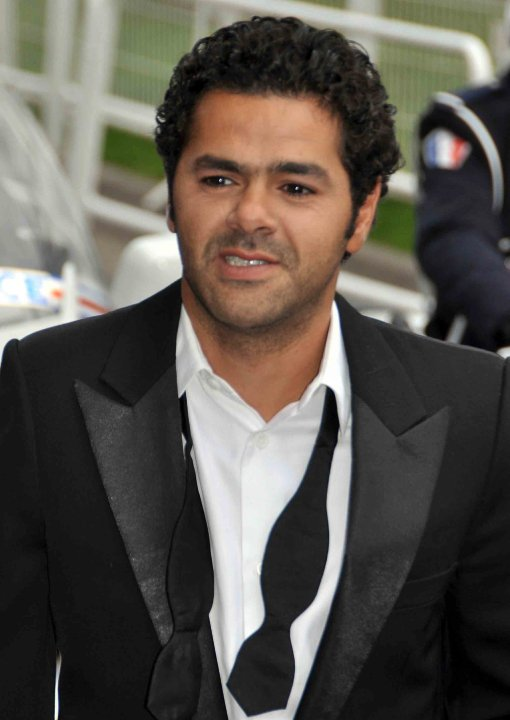
Jamel Debbouze

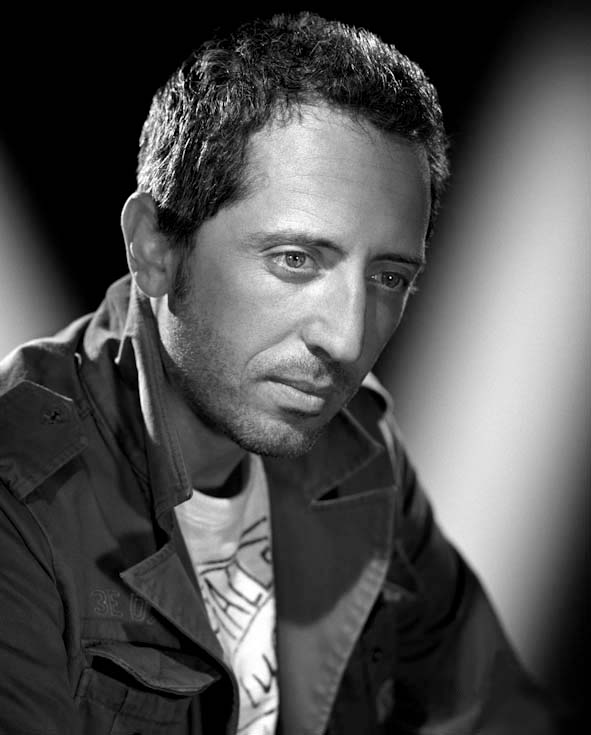
Gad Elmaleh

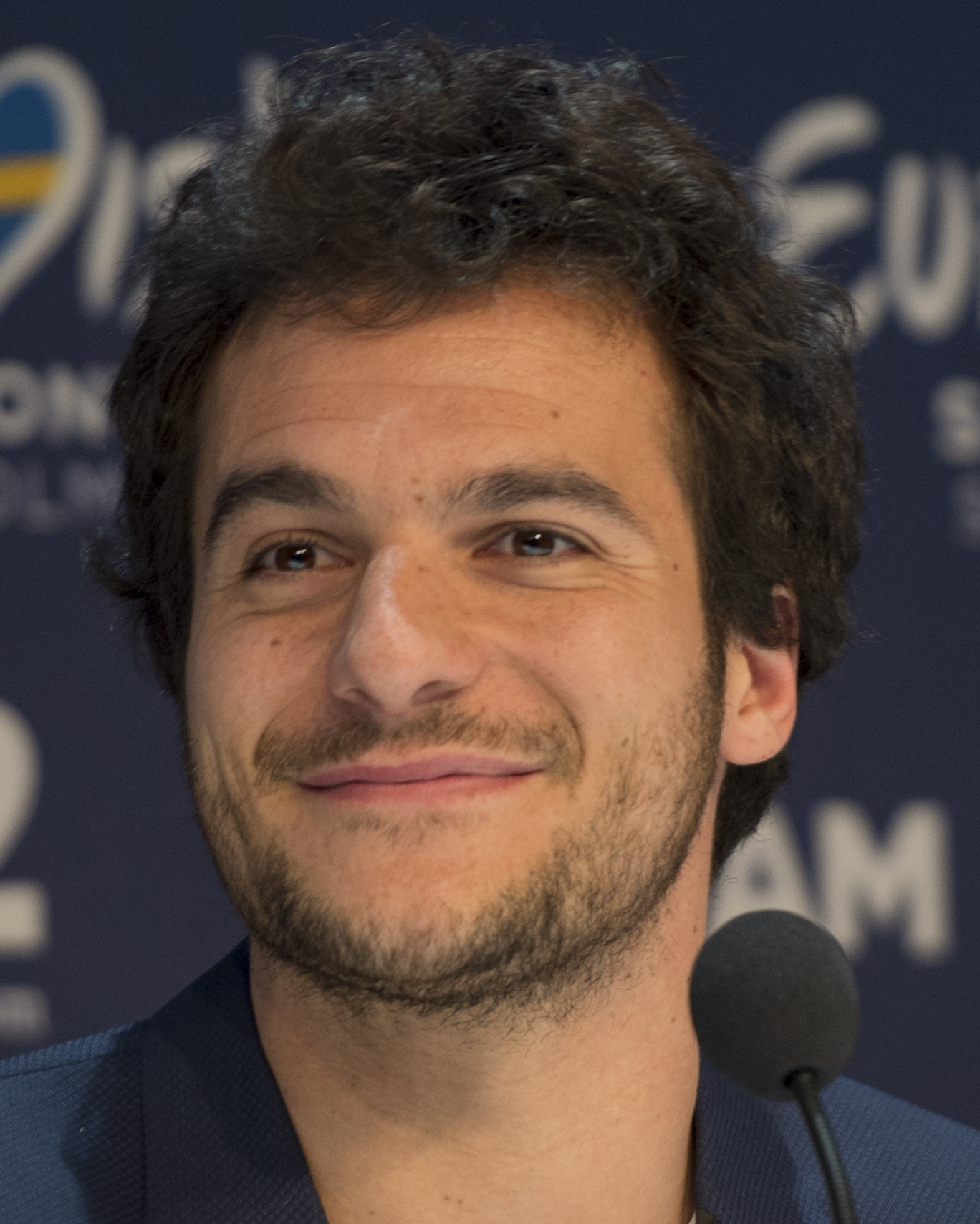
Amir

- Ary Abittan, actor
- Richard Anconina, actor
- Pierre Assouline, journalist
- Aure Atika, actress
- José Bénazéraf, film director, scriptwriter and producer
- Rachida Dati, politician
- Jamel Debbouze, humorist
- Gad Elmaleh, humorist
- Sofia Essaïdi, singer and actress
- David Guetta, house music DJ
- Roger Karoutchi, politician
- Yasmine Lafitte, pornstar
- Élie Semoun, humorist
- Sofiane Oumiha, boxer
- Saïd Taghmaoui, actor
- Elisa Tovati, actress
- Najat Vallaud-Belkacem, French Minister of Women's Rights and spokesperson for the government since May 2012
- Roschdy Zem, actor
- Amel Bent, singer
- Amine, singer
- Amir, singer
- Frida Boccara, singer
- Booba, rapper
- Édith Piaf, singer
- La Fouine, rapper, singer
- Sapho, singer
- Adil Rami, footballer
- Matteo Guendouzi, footballer

== Netherlands ==
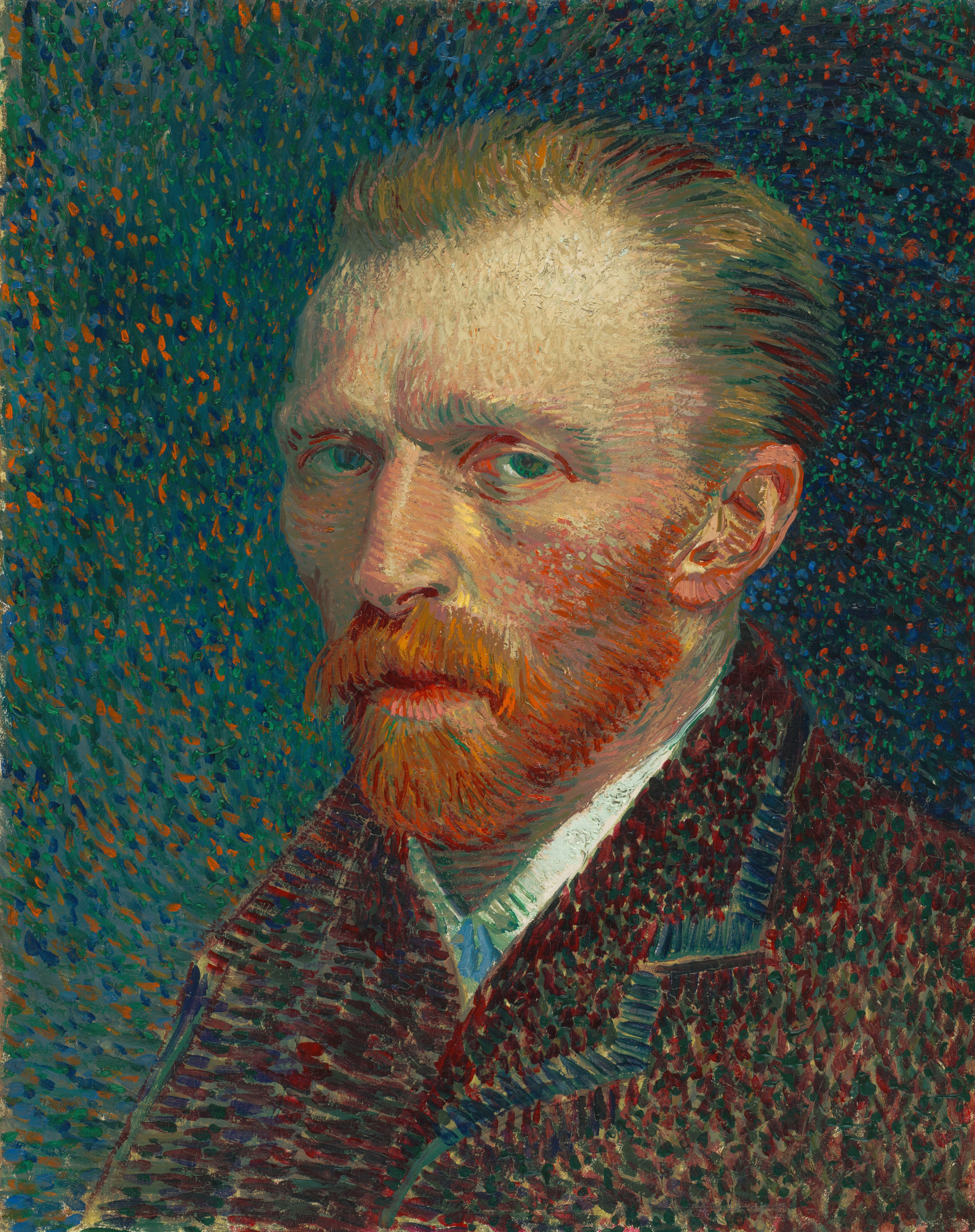
Vincent van Gogh

- Mata Hari, exotic dancer and a spy
- Tony Parker, basketball player
- Vincent van Gogh, painter
- Bertha of Holland, queen of France from 1072 until 1092
- Ary Scheffer, painter

== New Zealand ==
- Katherine Mansfield, writer

== Norway ==
- Eva Joly, politician and former judge
- Alexis Pinturault, alpine ski racer
- Yann Tiersen, musician

== Peru ==
- Jorge Chávez, aviator
- Elodie Frenck, actress
- Flora Tristan, socialist writer and activist
- Verónika Mendoza, psychologist, educator, and politician

== Philippines ==
- Alphonse Areola, footballer
- Neal Maupay, footballer

== Poland ==
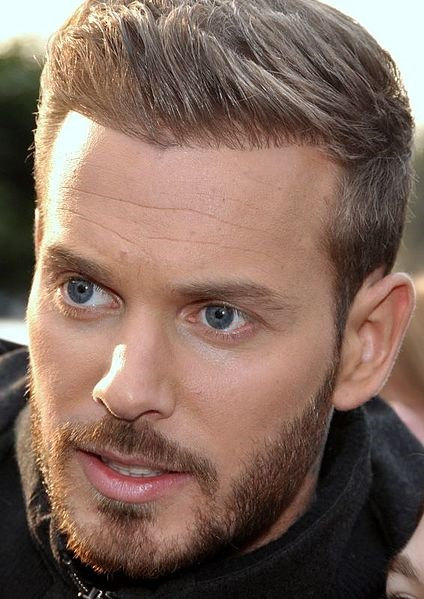
M. Pokora

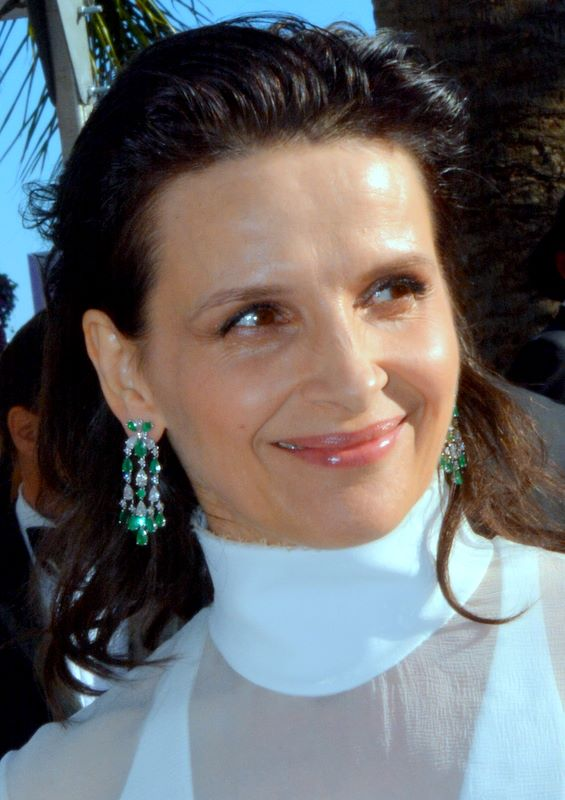
Juliette Binoche

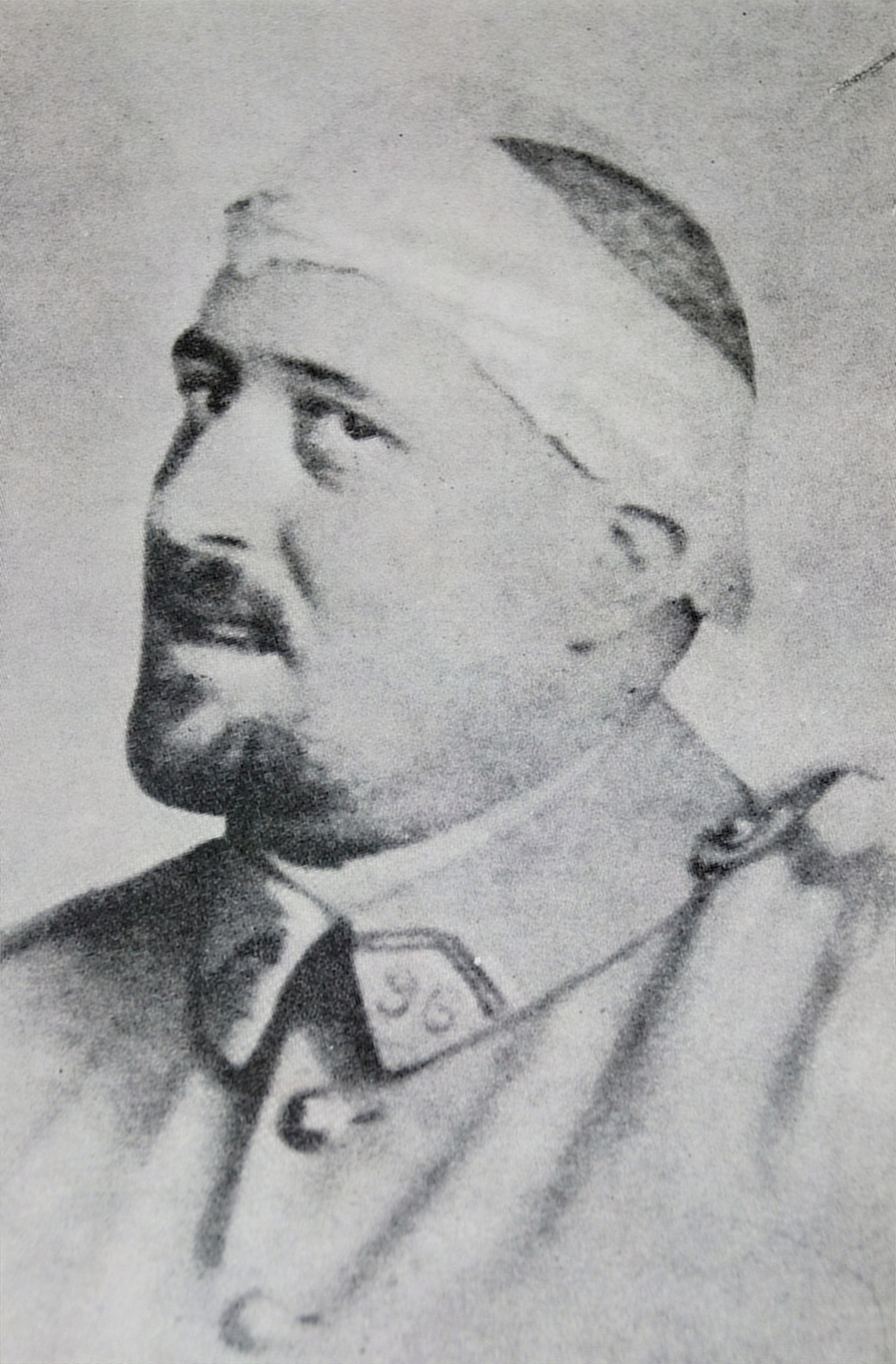
Guillaume Apollinaire

- Guillaume Apollinaire, writer
- Robert Badinter, lawyer, academic, essayist and politician
- Stephane Bern, journalist, radio host and television presentator
- Claude Berri, film director
- Juliette Binoche, actress
- Marie-George Buffet, politician
- Eve Curie, writer
- Alain Finkielkraut, philosopher, writer and essayist
- Jean-Pierre Foucault, television personality
- Judith Godrèche, actress
- Jean-Jacques Goldman, singer
- René Goscinny, writer, humorist, known around the world for the Asterix books
- Władysław Czartoryski, noble
- Constance Jablonski, model
- Michel Jazy, middle distance runner
- Irène Joliot-Curie, scientist
- Raymond Kopa, football player
- Laurent Koscielny, football player
- Nathalie Kosciusko-Morizet, politician
- Marie Leszczyńska, queen of France from 1725 until 1768
- Louane, singer
- Jean-Marie Lustiger, Archbishop of Paris
- Frédéric Michalak, rugby player
- Alexis Michalik, actor
- Jean-Pierre Mocky, film director
- Natoo, YouTuber
- Ludovic Obraniak, football player
- Damien Perquis, football player
- M. Pokora, singer
- Roman Polanski, film director
- Michel Poniatowski, politician
- Catherine Ringer, singer
- Maria Josepha of Saxony, dauphine of France
- Simone Signoret, actress
- Marie Walewska, noblewoman and mistress of Napoleon I
- Michel Wieviorka, sociologue
- Georges Wolinski, cartoonist and comics writer

== Portugal ==
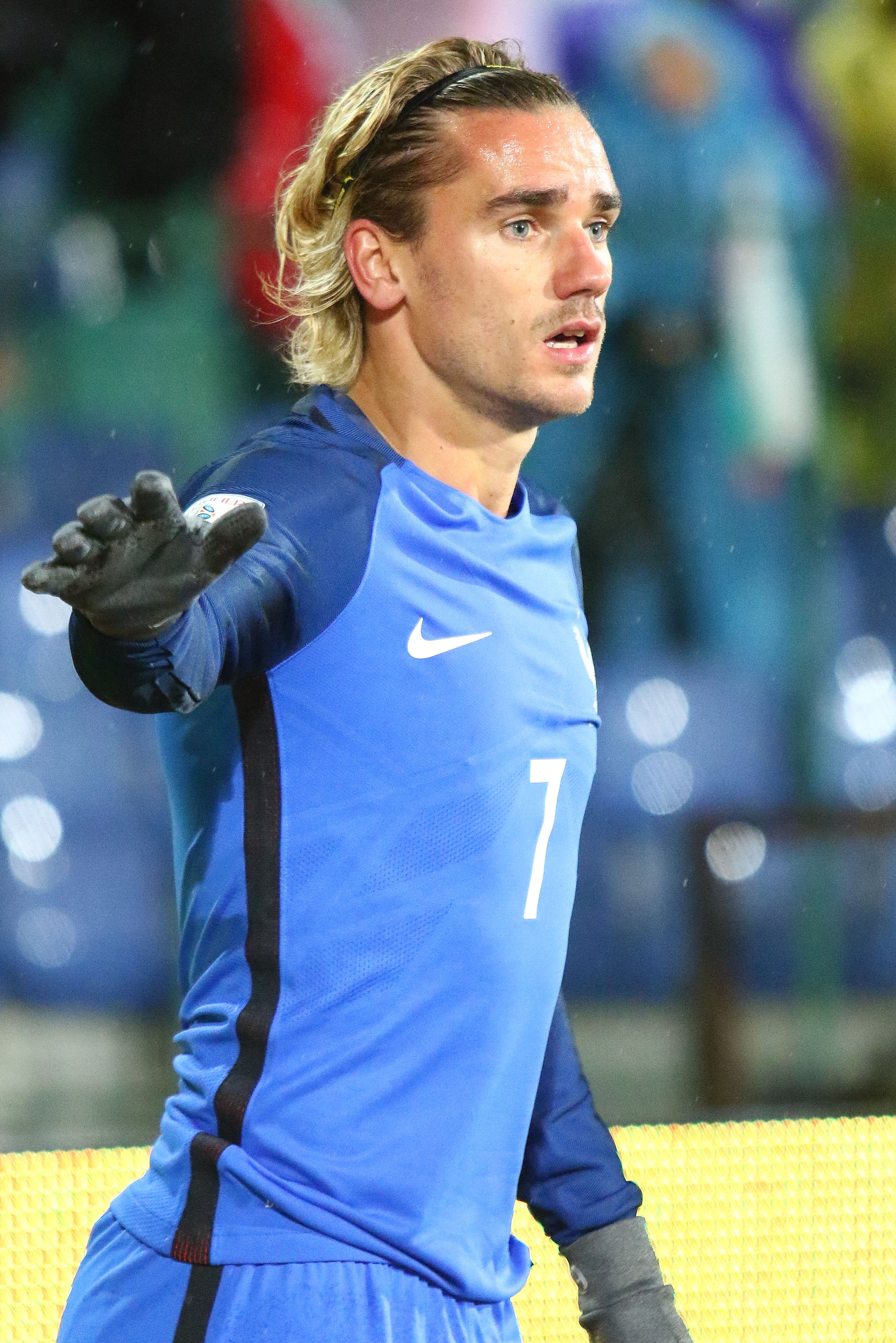
Antoine Griezmann

- Guy-Manuel de Homem-Christo, musician (Daft Punk member)
- Linda de Suza, singer
- Kevin Gameiro, footballer
- Antoine Griezmann, footballer
- Louane, singer
- Marie Myriam, singer
- Morgan Parra, rugby player
- Robert Pires, footballer
- Lisandro Cuxi, singer
- Steven Da Costa, karateka
- Armando Teixeira

== Romania ==
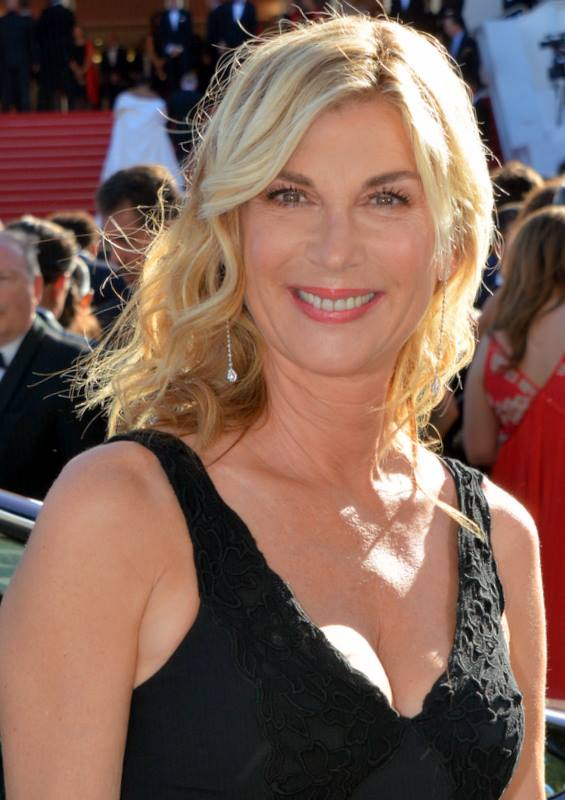
Michèle Laroque

- Jean-François Copé, politician
- Claude Berri, film director
- Michel Drucker, French journalist and TV host
- Eugène Ionesco, writer
- Cyprien Iov, YouTube celebrity
- Michèle Laroque, actress
- Pierre Moscovici, politician
- Anna de Noailles, writer and socialist
- Ana Cata-Chitiga, basketball player
- Cédric Pioline, tennis player
- Élisabeth Roudinesco, historian
- Maria Schneider, actress
- Paul-Loup Sulitzer, writer
- Pierre Vassiliu, singer

== Russia ==
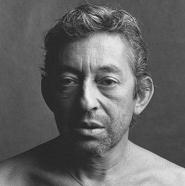
Serge Gainsbourg

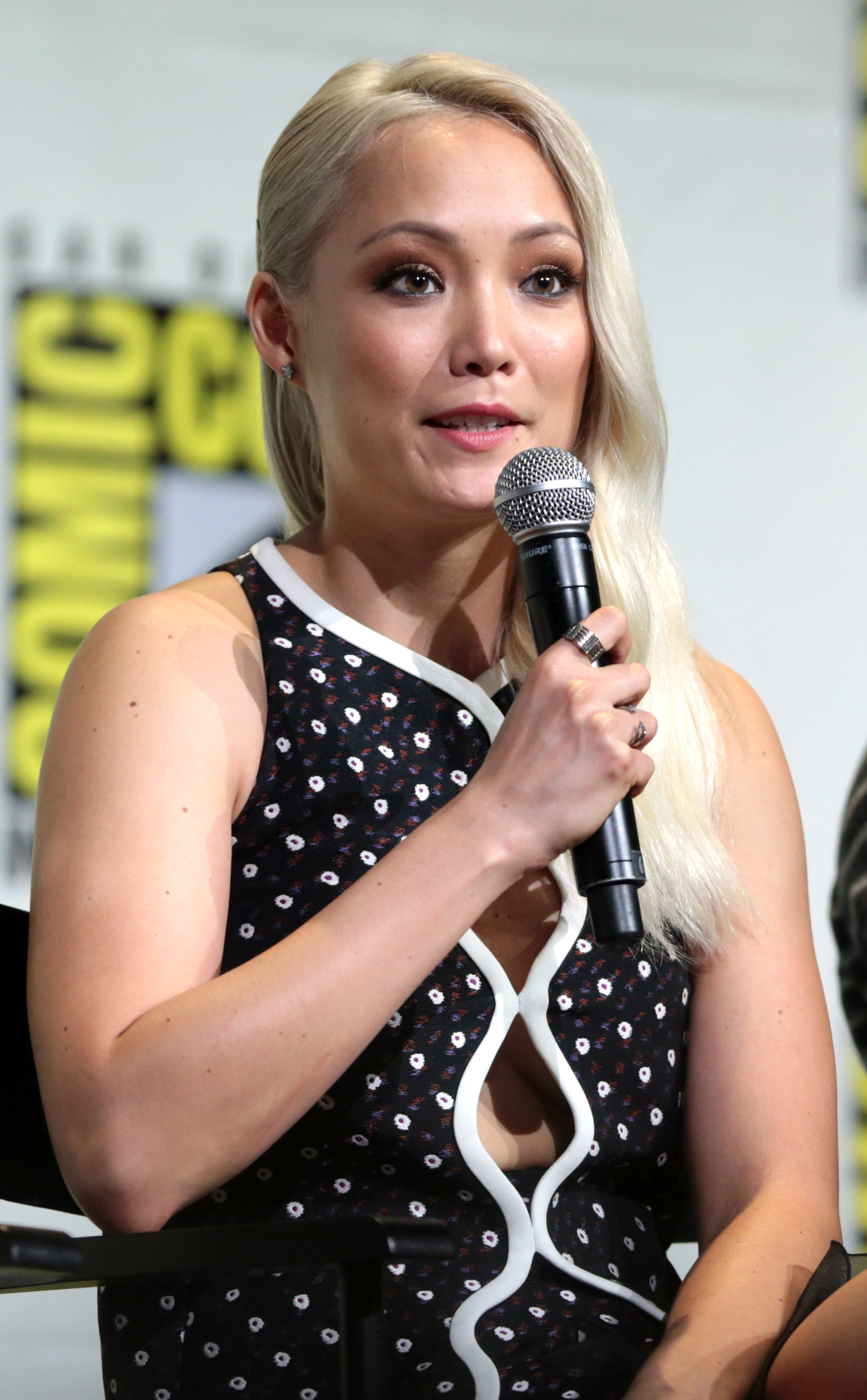
Pom Klementieff

- Alexander Alekhine, chess player
- Irina Alexandrovna, Russian princess
- Natalia Brasova, Russian noblewoman
- Amira Casar, actress
- Carlos, singer
- Marc Chagall, painter
- Joe Dassin, singer
- Catherine Dolgorukov, mistress of tsar Alexander II of Russia
- François Feldman, singer
- Charlotte Gainsbourg, actress
- Serge Gainsbourg, singer, poet, actor and director
- Judith Godrèche, actress
- Olga Khokhlova, ballet dancer
- Pom Klementieff, actress
- Olga Kurylenko, actress
- Vladislav Tkachiev, chess player
- Rudolf Nureyev, dancer
- Gérard Oury, film director
- Léon Poliakov, historian
- Michel Polnareff, singer
- Maxime Rodinson, historian
- Thierry Roland, TV commentator
- Nathalie Sarraute, writer
- Jacques Tati, film director and actor
- Marina Vlady, actress
- Felix Yusupov, Russian aristocrat
- Irina Yusupova, Russian princess
- Léon Zitrone, journalist

== Rwanda ==
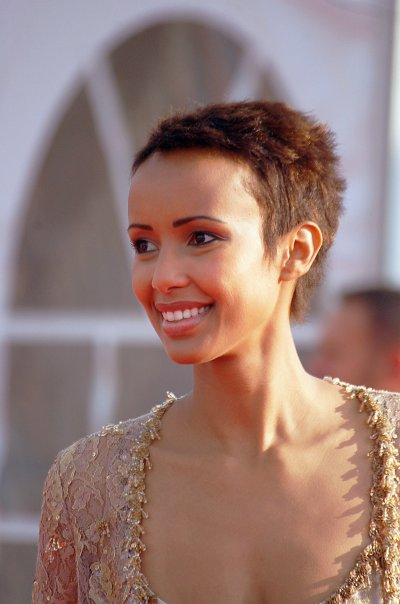
Sonia Rolland

- Sonia Rolland, actress and Miss France 2000

== Senegal ==
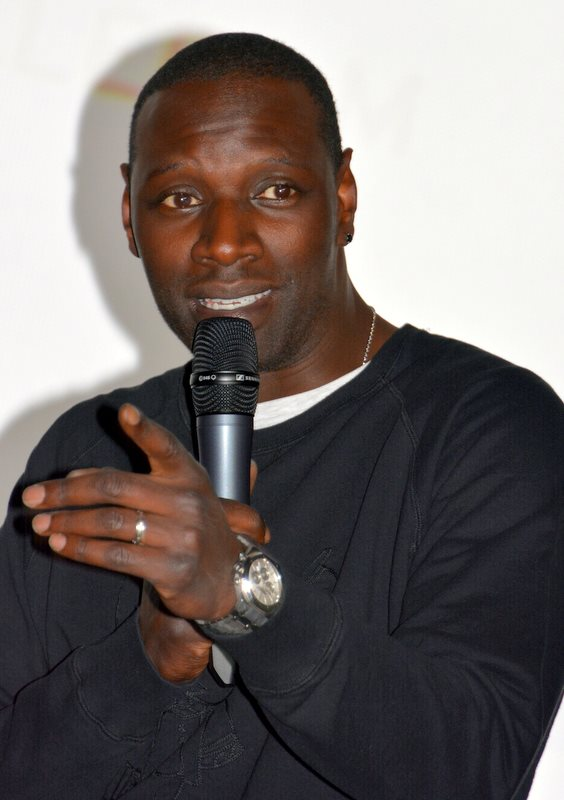
Omar Sy

- Booba, rapper
- Patrice Evra, footballer
- Bafétimbi Gomis, footballer
- Aïssa Maïga, actress
- Benjamin Mendy, footballer
- MC Solaar, rap and hip-hop artist
- Omar Sy, actor
- Patrick Vieira, footballer
- Rama Yade, politician
- Mouhamadou Fall, sprinter

== Serbia ==
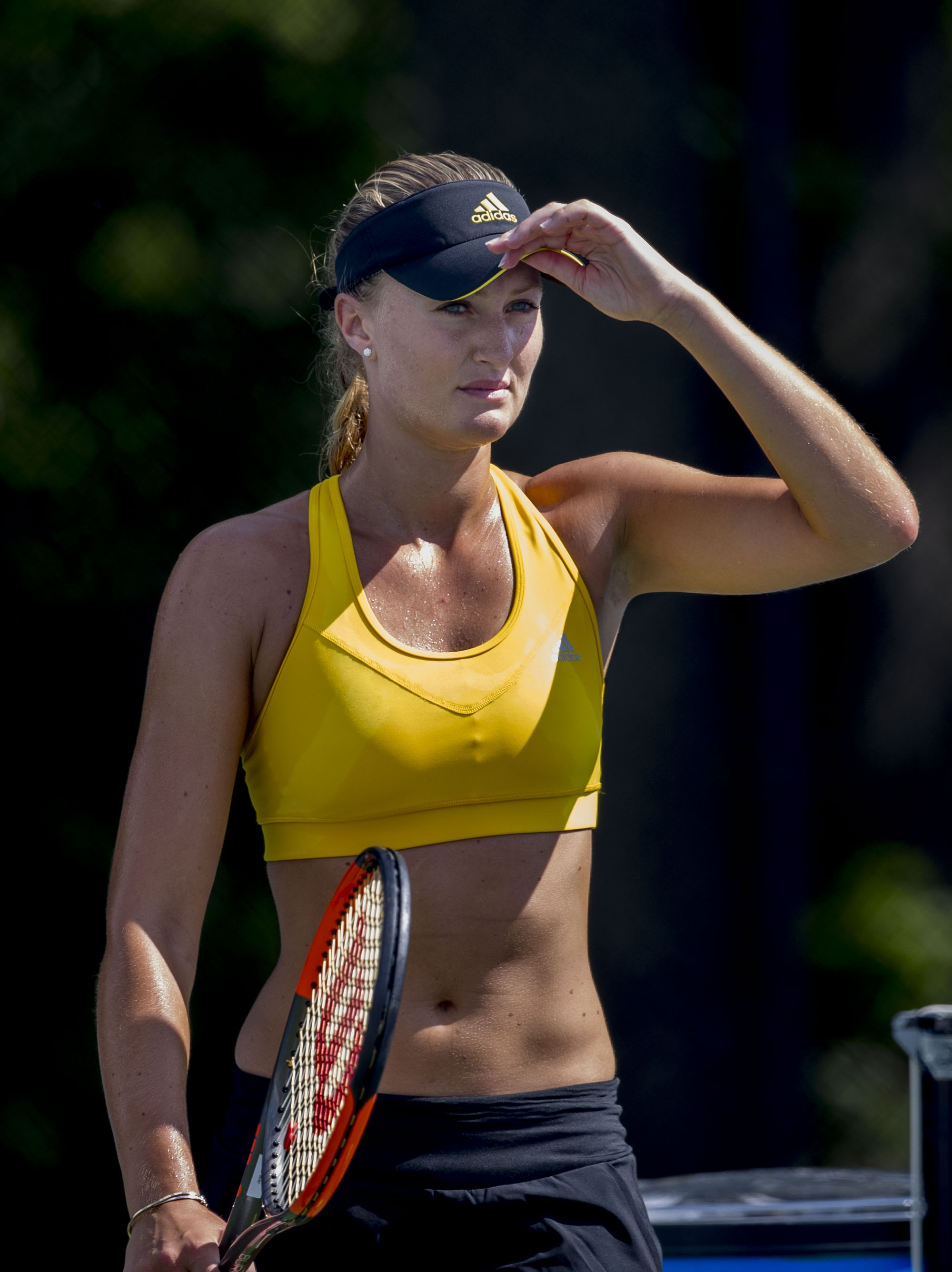
Kristina Mladenovic

- Pierre Marinovitch, World War I flying ace
- Kristina Mladenovic, tennis player
- Sebastian, musician and DJ
- Vladimir Veličković, painter
- Stefan Bajic, footballer

== South Africa ==
- Pieter de Villiers, rugby player
- Brian Liebenberg, rugby player
- Gerhard Vosloo, rugby player

== South Korea ==
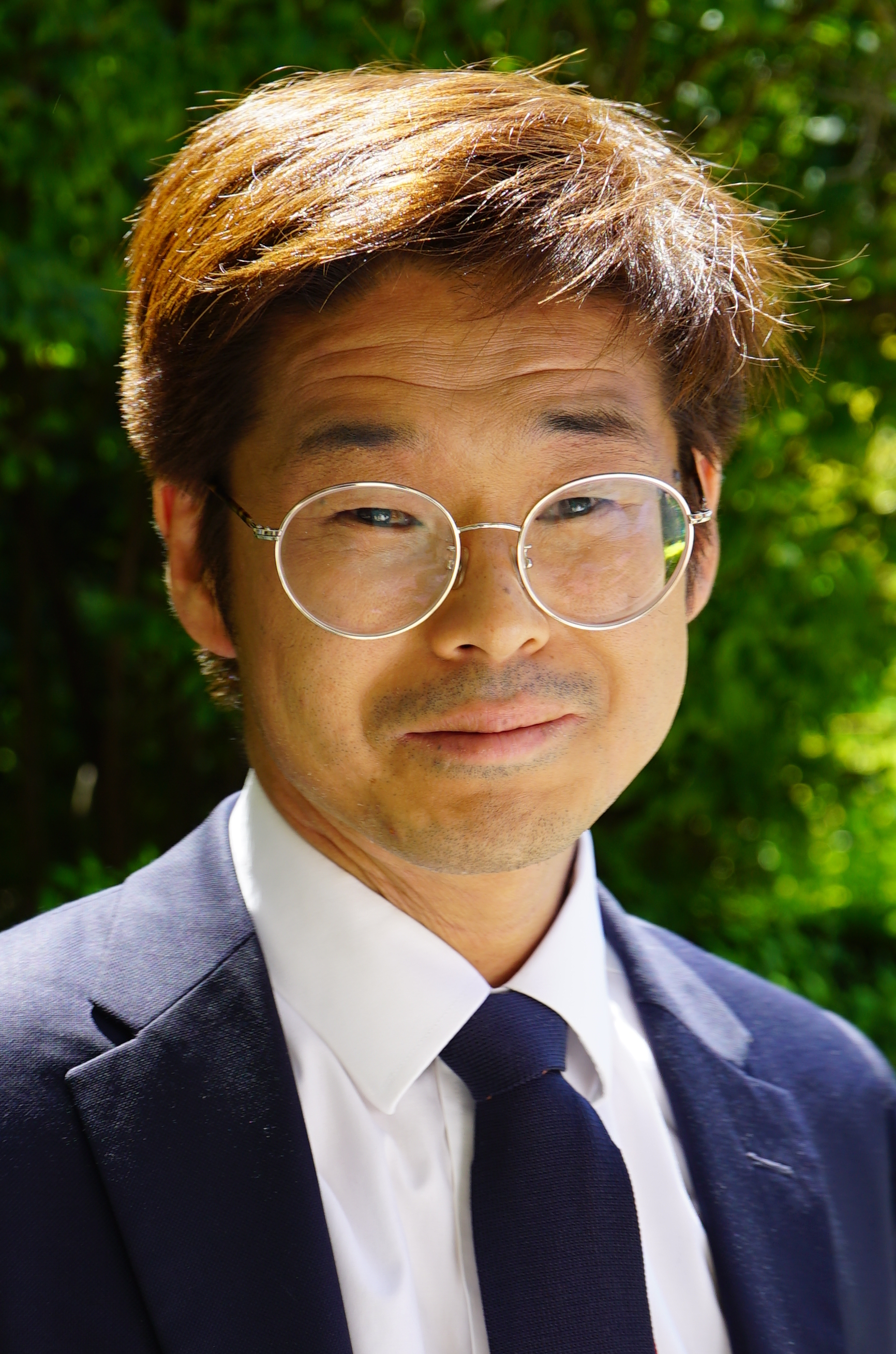
Joachim Son-Forget

- Julien Kang, actor
- Daul Kim, model
- Pom Klementieff, actress
- Fleur Pellerin, Ministry of Culture
- Jean-Vincent Placé, politician
- Lydie Solomon, pianist
- Joachim Son-Forget, politician

== Spain ==
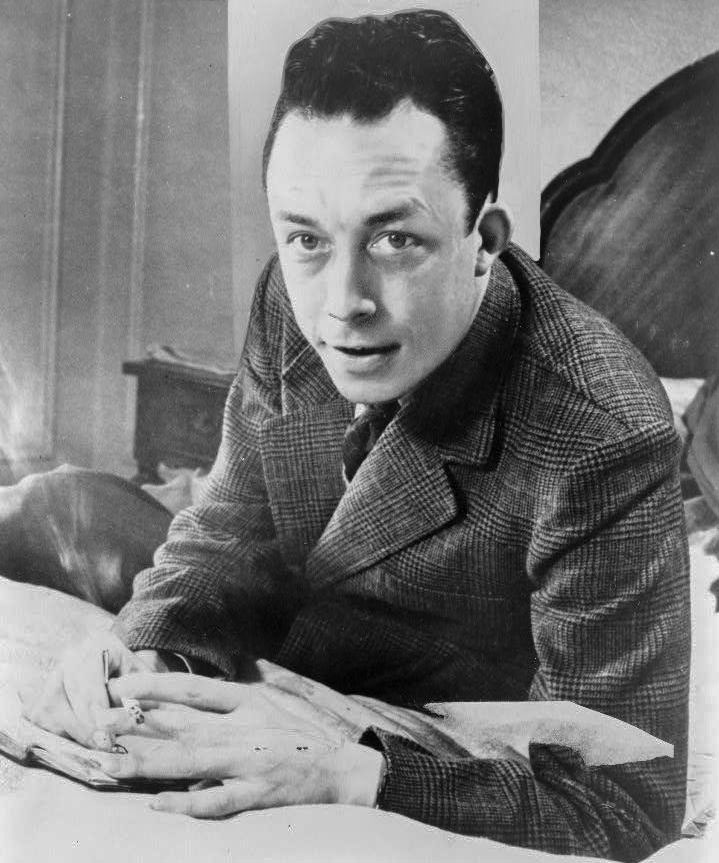
Albert Camus

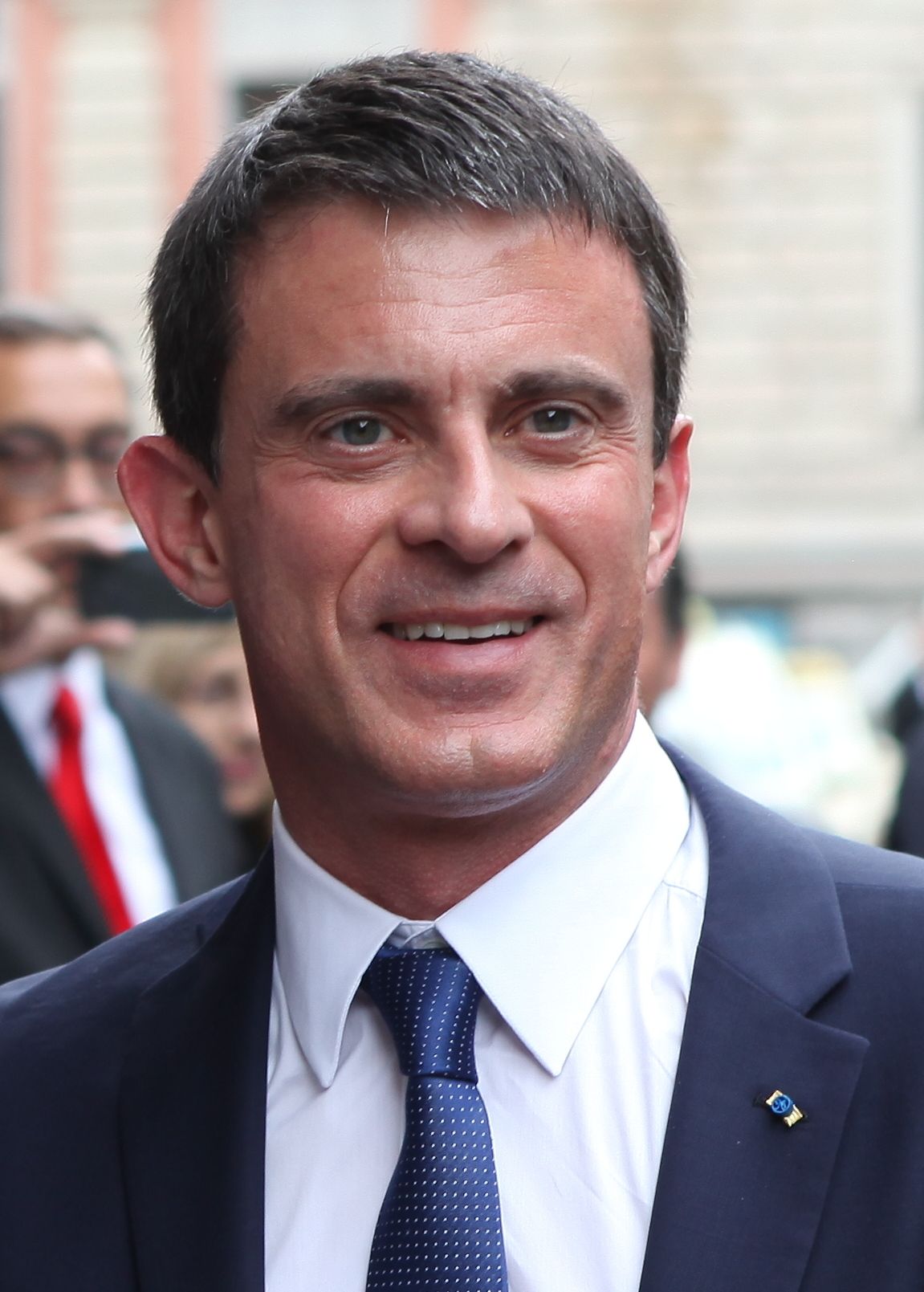
Manuel Valls

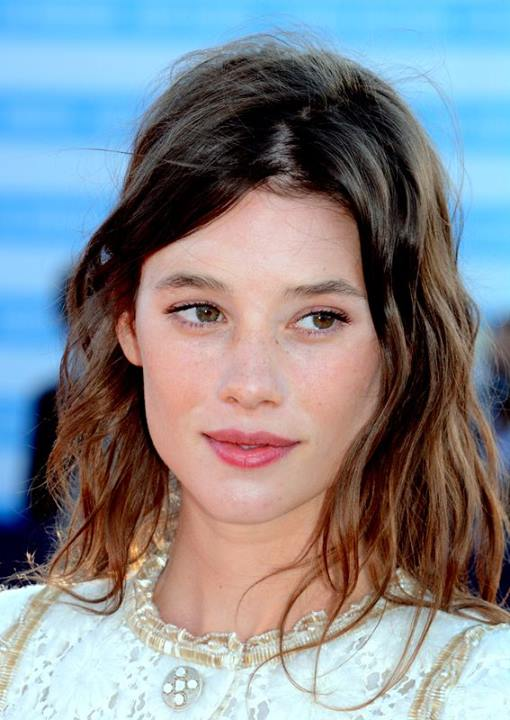
Astrid Bergès-Frisbey

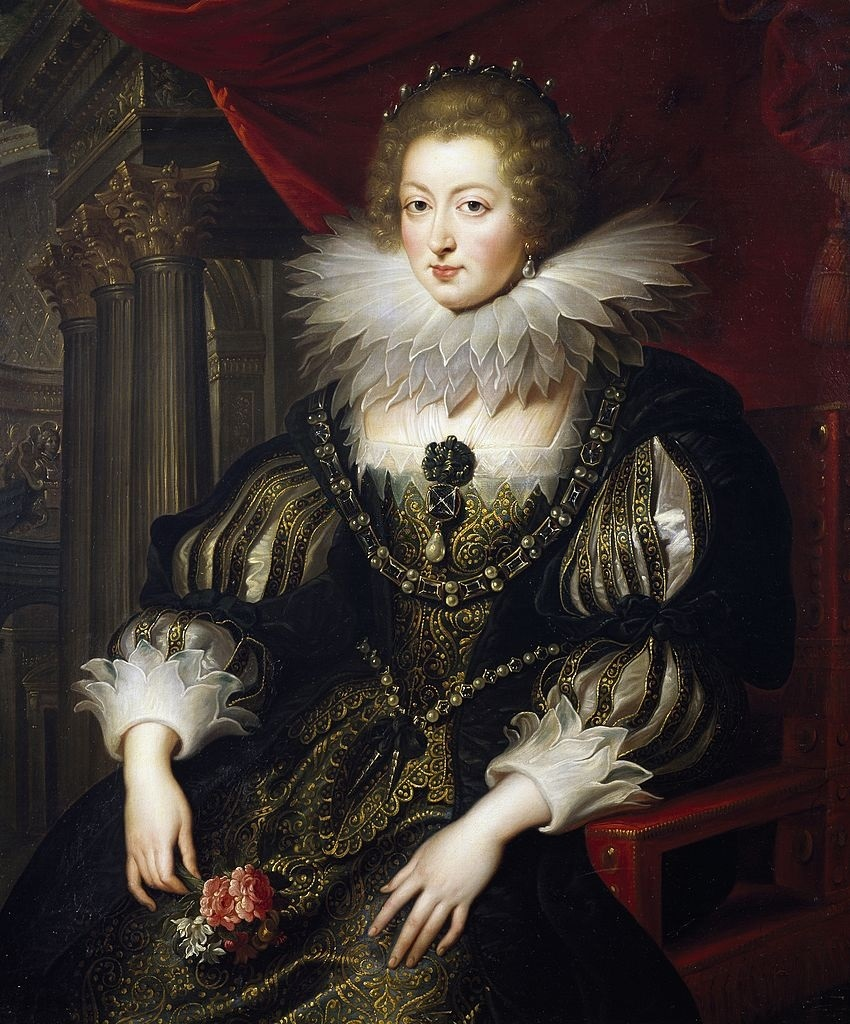
Anne of Austria

- Anne of Austria, queen of France from 1615 until 1643
- Ruben Aguilar, footballer
- Àstrid Bergès-Frisbey, actress
- Albert Camus, Nobel Prize-winning author
- Eric Cantona, actor and footballer
- Blanche of Castile, queen of France from 1223 until 1226
- Manu Chao, singer and musician
- Raymond Domenech, former Manager of the French national soccer team
- Anh Duong, actress and model
- Luis Fernández, football player
- Louis de Funès, actor
- José Garcia, actor
- Lucas Hernandez, footballer
- Théo Hernandez, footballer
- Anne Hidalgo, politician
- Raphaël Ibañez, rugby player
- Virginie Ledoyen, actress
- Frédéric Lopez, television host
- Maria Theresa of Spain, queen of France from 1660 until 1683
- Maria Teresa Rafaela of Spain, dauphine of France
- Caroline Garcia, tennis player
- Maria Malibran, mezza-soprano
- Olivier Martinez, actor
- Jean-Luc Mélenchon, politician
- Eugénie de Montijo, the last Empress of France from 1853 until 1870
- La Belle Otero, actress and dancer
- Pablo Picasso, painter and sculptor
- Paloma Picasso, fashion designer
- Robert Pires, footballer
- David Pujadas, journalist
- Alexandre Lloveras, cyclist
- Jean Reno, actor
- Clara Morgane, singer and actress
- Olivia Ruiz, singer
- Jaime Semprún, essayist and translator
- Fernando Sor, guitarist and composer
- André Téchiné, film director
- Mathieu Valbuena, footballer
- Manuel Valls, French Socialist Party (PS) politician, Minister of the Interior
- Ray Ventura, jazz bandleader
- Pauline Viardot, mezza-soprano

== Sweden ==
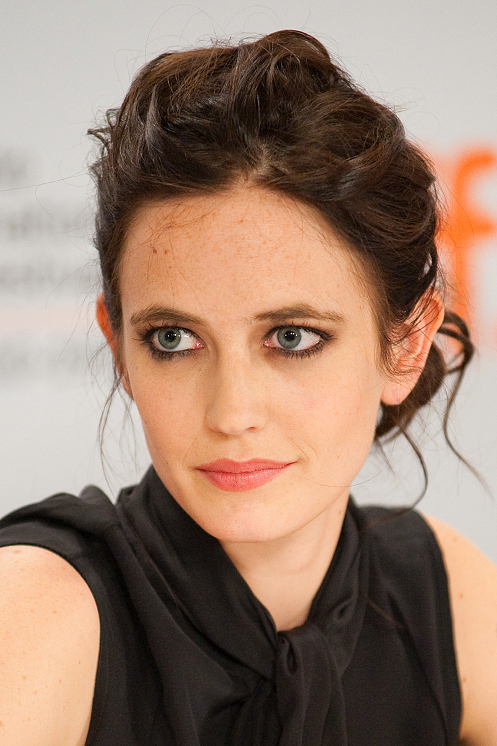
Eva Green

- Eva Green, actress
- Mathilda May, actress
- Max von Sydow, actor

== Switzerland ==
- Benjamin Constant, activist and writer
- Fabrice Ehret, football player
- Joseph Favre, chef
- Françoise Giroud, journalist, writer ans politician
- Eugène Grasset, artist
- Jean-Luc Godard, film director
- Romain Grosjean, racing driver
- Le Corbusier, architect
- Jean-Paul Marat, journalist and politician during French Revolution
- Quentin Mosimann, musician
- Jacques Necker, banker
- Jean-Jacques Rousseau, writer and composer

== Thailand ==
- Emmanuelle Arsan, novelist
- Tristan Do, footballer

== Togo ==
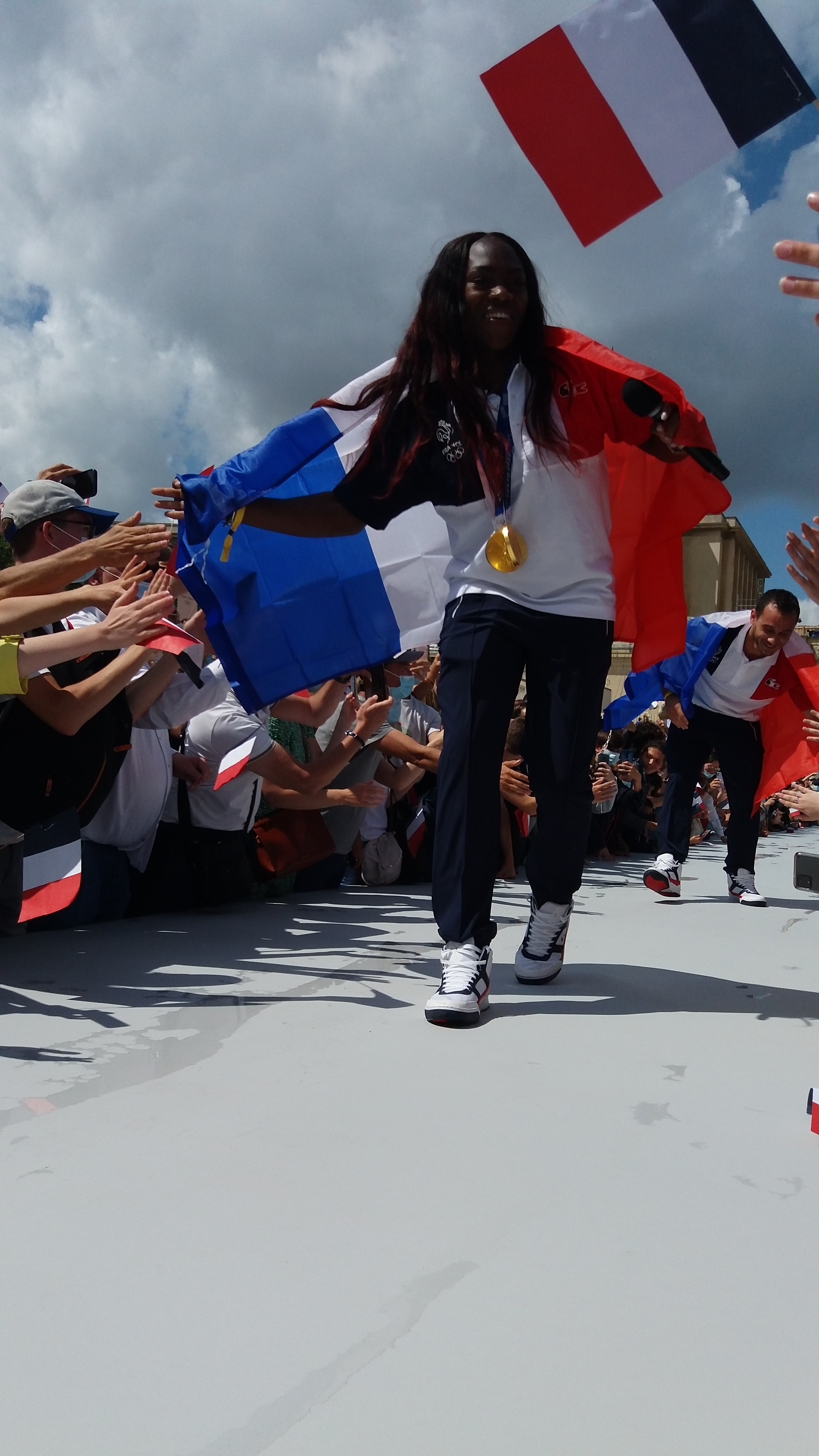
Clarisse Agbegnenou

- Corentin Tolisso, footballer
- Clarisse Agbegnenou, judoka
- Angelina Lanza, athlete
- Mathieu Dossevi

== Tunisia ==
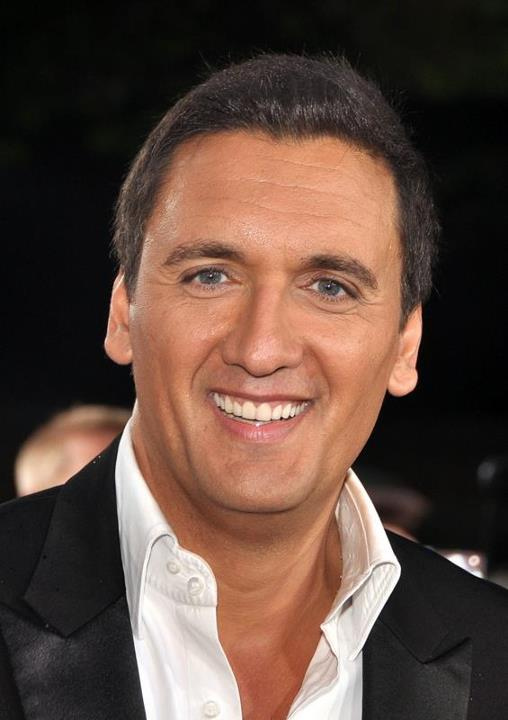
Danny Brillant

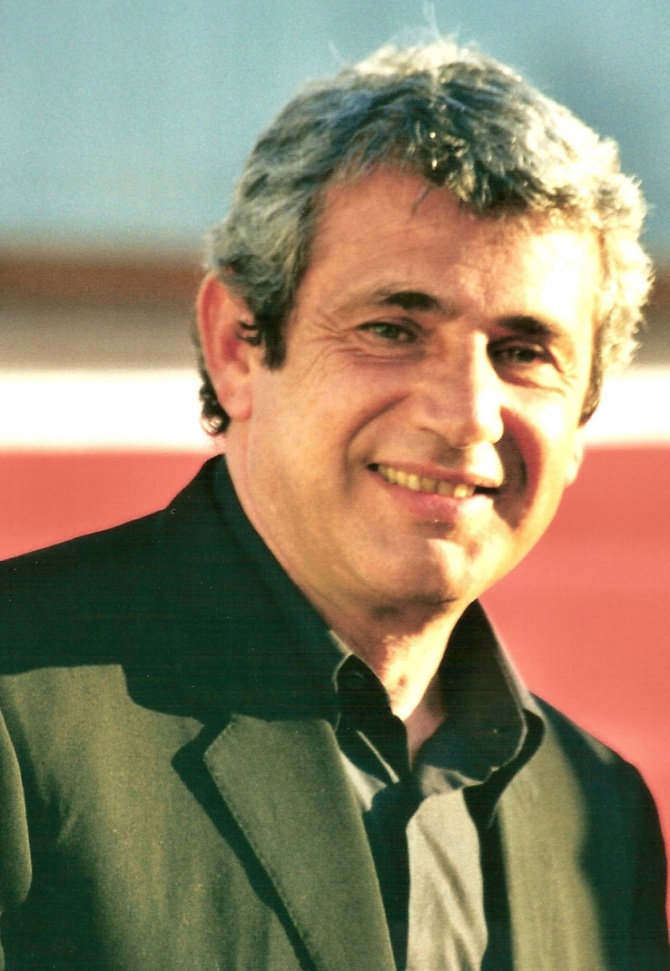
Michel Boujenah

- Ary Abittan, actor
- Kev Adams, actor
- Sami Bouajila, actor
- Michel Boujenah, humorist
- Dany Brillant, singer
- Georges Cravenne, founder of the César Award
- Marcel Dadi, guitar player
- Morhad Amdouni, runner
- Hamida Djandoubi, murderer and last person executed in France
- Gisèle Halimi, lawyer
- Serge Halimi, journalist
- Cyril Hanouna, television presenter, producer and comedian
- Agnès Jaoui, actress
- David Jemmali, soccer player
- Abdellatif Kechiche, film director
- Lââm, singer
- Pierre Lellouche, politician
- Didier Marouani, composer and musician
- Albert Memmi, writer
- Serge Moati, journalist and film director
- Yael Naim, singer
- Dominique Strauss-Kahn, politician
- Ariel Zeitoun, film director, scriptwriter and producer
- Tunisiano, rapper
- Riadh Tarsim, cyclist
- Wissam Ben Yedder, footballer

== Turkey ==
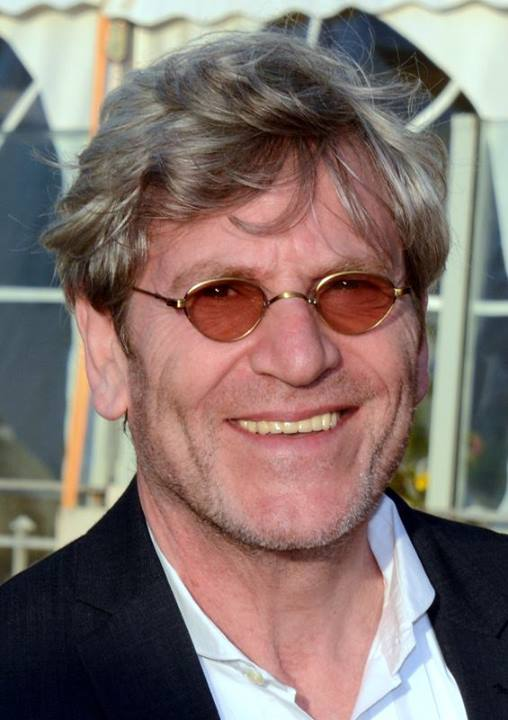
Tchéky Karyo

- Mirra Alfassa, spiritual guru
- Édouard Balladur, politician
- Cansel Elçin, actor
- Mevlüt Erdinç, footballer
- Deniz Gamze Ergüven, film director
- Françoise Giroud, journalist, writer and politician
- Nedim Gürsel, writer
- Mustapha Haciane, novelist and poet
- Tchéky Karyo, actor
- Mathilda May, actress
- Elif Shafak, novelist and women's right activist
- Benjamin Stambouli, footballer
- Atila Turan, footballer

== Ukraine ==
- Mylène Demongeot, actress
- Pierre Bérégovoy, politician
- Serge Gainsbourg, singer
- Charlotte Gainsbourg, actress
- Olga Kurylenko, actress
- Serge Lifar, dancer and choreographer
- Oksana Shachko, artist and activist
- Alexandra Shevchenko, artist and activist
- Anne of Kiev, queen of France from 1051 until 1060

== United States ==
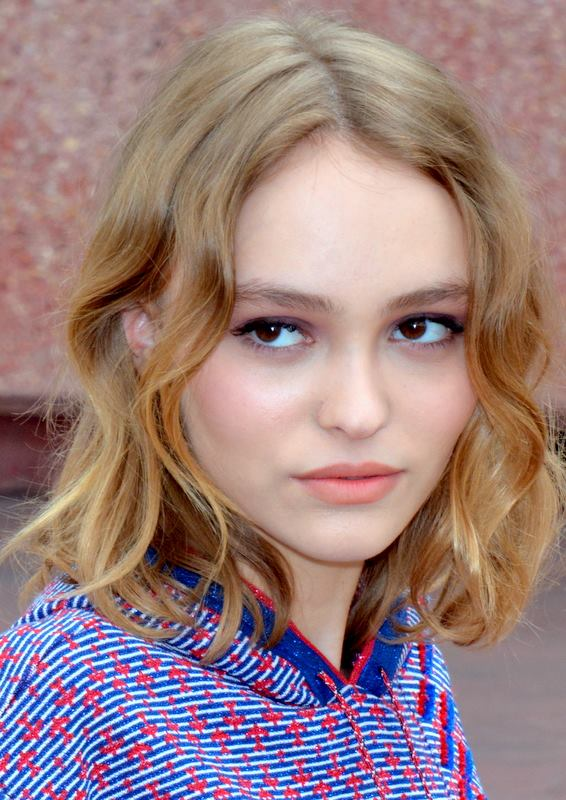
Lily-Rose Depp

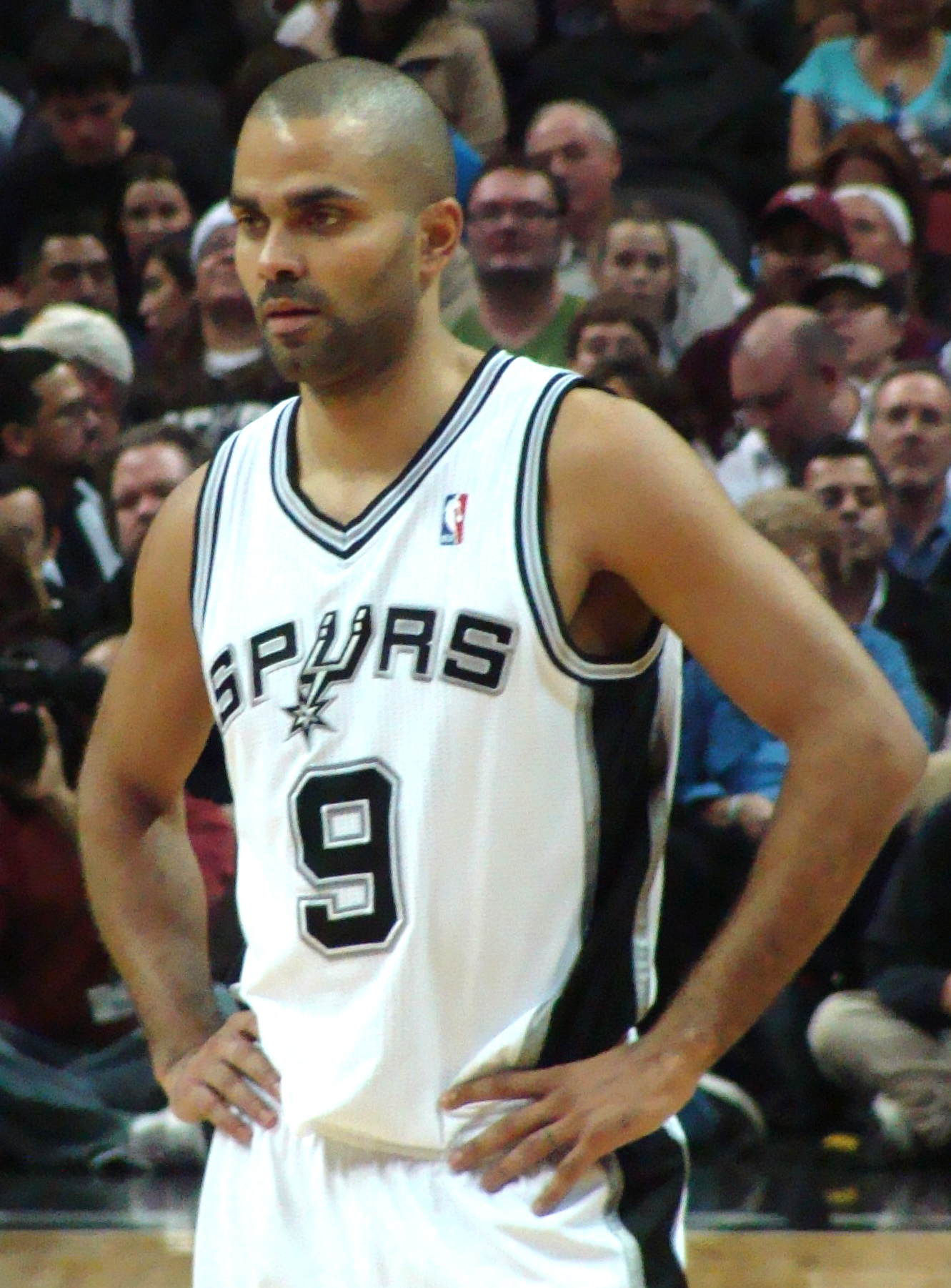
Tony Parker

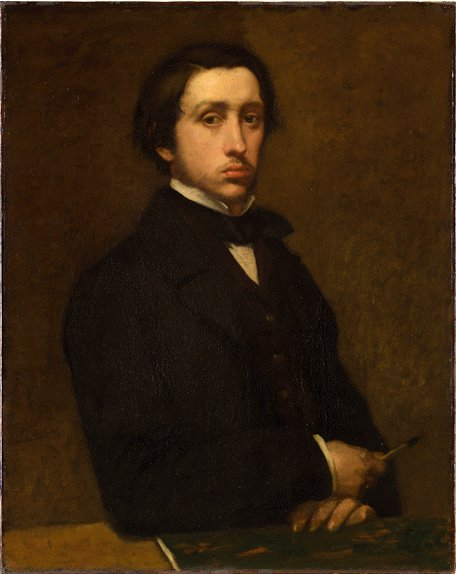
Edgar Degas

- Josephine Baker (died in 1975), entertainer of African-American heritage
- Mickey Baker, guitarist
- Sylvia Beach, bookseller
- Sidney Bechet, jazz saxophonist
- Àstrid Bergès-Frisbey, actress
- Laurie Berkner, singer
- Leos Carax, film director
- Leslie Caron, actress
- Natalie Clifford Barney, writer
- Alexa Davalos, actress
- Edgar Degas, artist
- Lily-Rose Depp, actress, daughter of Vanessa Paradis
- Isadora Duncan, dancer
- Carole Fredericks, singer
- Loïe Fuller, dancer
- Virginie Amélie Avegno Gautreau, socialite
- Guy Georges, serial killer
- Franz-Olivier Giesbert, television presenter
- Kathie Lee Gifford, actress, singer, and talk show host
- Anastasia Griffith, actress
- Rosella Hightower, dancer
- Andrea King, actress
- Brice Lelonde, politician
- Tonie Marshall, film director
- Chloé Mortaud, actress and Miss France 2009
- Tony Parker, basketball player
- Mary Pierce, tennis player
- Man Ray, painter and photographer
- Nina Simone (died in 2003), singer
- Yeardley Smith, actress and voice actress
- Gertrude Stein, novelist, poet and playwright

== Uruguay ==
- Jules Laforgue, poet
- Elli Medeiros, singer
- Jules Supervielle, poet

== Venezuela ==
- Serge Blanco, former rugby union footballer
- Marisol Escobar, sculptor
- Laurence Debray, writer

== Vietnam ==
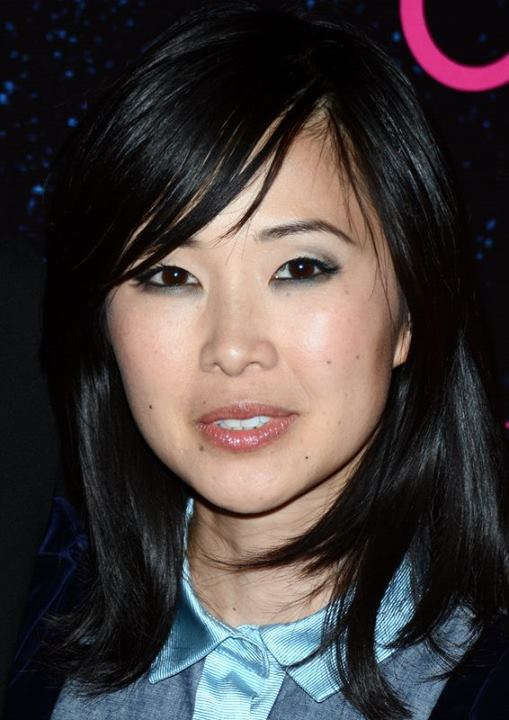
Linh Dan Pham

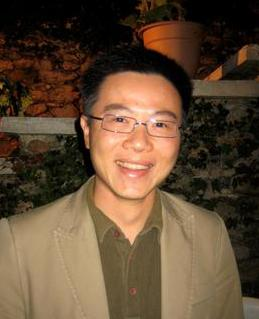
Ngô Bảo Châu

- Ngô Bảo Châu, mathematician
- Linh Dan Pham, actress
- Aliette de Bodard, writer
- Anh Duong, actress and model
- Kayane, electronic sports player and journalist
- Nikolai Kinski, actor
- Thích Nhất Hạnh, Buddhist monk and peace activist
- Trần Anh Hùng, film director
- France Nuyen, actress
- Céline Tran, actress
- François Trinh-Duc, rugby player
- Bopha Kong, taekwondo practitioner

== See also ==
- Immigration to France
- Demographics of France
