= Seong Mi-na =

Fictional character

- Soulcalibur character
- Seong Mi-na in Soulcalibur III
- First game: Soul Edge (1995)
- Designed by: Koji Mitsunaga; Hideo Yoshi (SCIII); Hiroaki Hashimoto (SCVI)
- Voiced by: English: Molly Lin (SCII); Erika Lenhart (SCIII); Erica Mendez (SCVI); Japanese: Houko Kuwashima (SC–SCIII); Sanae Kobayashi (SCIV); Chinatsu Akasaki (SCVI)

In-universe information
- Origin: Korea
- Nationality: Korean

Seong Mi-na (Japanese: ソン・ミナ, Hepburn: Son Mina), sometimes written as Seung Mina, is a character from the Soulcalibur series. Originating in the 1995 Bandai Namco produced fighting game Soul Edge, she has appeared in every title in the series since, with the exception of Soulcalibur V.

== Conception and design ==
As a character introduced in Soul Edge, Seong Mi-na's weaponry, a [weapon], were selected before other elements of the character. Her design and concept were then built to revolve around it, starting with gender, then physical measurements, and lastly background details. As with all the characters, after her appearance and movement were fleshed out by a concept artist, her character was rendered as a 3D model by a design team that worked solely on her, and then animated by Tomoe Yamashita using motion capture to create her in-game movements. Early in development, she was simply called "Korean Gal".

She stands at 162 centimetres (5 ft 4 in) tall, and has a bust size of 78 cm (31 in). When designing her appearance, elements such as a bandana, apron, and exposed belly button were considered essential parts of her design, while her shorter hair was meant to give her more of a mature feel. They additionally wanted to emphasize her body as slender, using tight fighting clothing such as spats for some outfits to give her a "good Korean feel". These elements persisted into Soulcalibur, as they felt elements such as the exposed legs and stomach gave her a feel of unrestricted movement, and her clothing was changed to reflect traveling attire. This was meant to give her a more active lifestyle feel. In addition, the muscle tone in her arms was emphasized, as they felt she would develop it from using her weapon so often. Their biggest issue was figuring out how to portray the three year time gap between Soul Edge and Soulcalibur, deciding to give her her larger breasts and a rounder stomach to account for such.

For Soulcalibur VI, her appearance was designed by Hiroaki Hashimoto, who followed the motifs of her past designs, but with the intention of giving her a "new, stylish image" such as adding a poncho-style cape. The coloring went through several itterations, deciding in the end to go with an emphasis on pink over orange. The finalized design was intended to represent a hybrid of her main and tertiary outfits from Soul Edge.

== Appearances ==
Introduced in Soul Edge, Seong Mi-na is a young Korean woman, excelling at weapon usage but regarded as simply a girl by her peers. Barred from joining the coast guard due to her gender, she sought out the rumored "Sword of Salvation", which in actuality was Soul Edge, to prove herself. Hwang eventually caught up with her and dragged her back home, but she set out again after her father's efforts to marry her to him became unbearable. Encountering another female warrior named Ivy, she challenged her but was quickly defeated, and learned from Ivy that not only was she still inexperienced but that the sword she sought was inherently evil. She later challenged an alcoholic armed with a bō staff who also quickly defeated her. Seong Mi-na requested training from him, and he taught her all his skills, revealing in a farewell letter his name as "Kong Xiuqiang", the long-lost father of Xianghua. However, before she set out she was dragged home once more by Hwang. She later encountered Hong Yun-seong, a student of her father angry after being disregarded by Hwang when he challenged him to a duel. Feeling sorry for him, she handed him her family heirloom, the dao 'White Storm', and later that night he set out himself after Soul Edge. Mi-na set out to retrieve the dao from him, this time with her father's blessing. Afterward, Mi-na met with an old man, Edge Master, who quickly defeated her in their battle, at which point he trained her for some time. She eventually confronted Yun-seong and together with his companion, Talim tried to convince him to abandon his quest, though he did not heed their warnings and left on his own one night while both women were asleep. Mi-na then promised Talim that she will find Yun-seong before they parted their ways. She is finally reunited with Yun-seong after the destruction of Soul Edge and the two go back home. Upon returning she is deemed as a national hero and begins training the younger generation with Hwang.

The new timeline reiterates Mi-na's adventures as she runs away from home to avoid marriage, loses to Ivy and Xiuqiang, and trains under the latter. She then goes on a dangerous mission to stop a cult from targeting a village and nearly gets killed. But Mi-na is saved by Hwang and the villagers, who were inspired by her bravery. She then reluctantly allows Hwang to take her home. Due to her infiltration at a base of Soul Edge's servants, she was targeted by the evil sword's servant Won Gabok, but was saved by Hwang and learned the true nature of Soul Edge. Her distaste towards Soul Edge and its evil nature has since becoming the reason she, Hwang and Talim tries to prevent Yun-seong from nearing it.

== Critical reception ==
Seong Mi-na has been well received since her debut. John Warren of Fanbyte stated a preference for the character over the similarly-armed Kilik, questioning why he was introduced in Soulcalibur when Mi-na sufficed, further stating "She’s tough, she’s not whiny, she does little hoppy kicks using her staff—she rules." Jesse Schedeen of IGN asked "what's not to like" regarding the character, describing her as using a weapon larger than many video game heroines would normally be able to handle. He further stated she wasn't a tomboy, instead emphasizing that the character had significant feminine charm, particularly regarding her Soulcalibur IV design, though at the same time questioned how she did not encounter wardrobe malfunctions during combat.

Chi Lee in an article for Kotaku meanwhile cited her as an example of how game developers have improved renditions of Korean characters as graphics in video games have progressed, but also how developers often relied exclusively on information of South Korean culture due to the difficulty in obtaining non-propaganda reference material from North Korea. On the other hand, Japanese magazine Gamest in their Gals Island series cited her as an example of how oriental character designs, particularly Chinese, were growing more prominent in video games around her debut. However, while they noted some Chinese influences in her design, they felt some aspects of drew more from Japanese attire.

Maddy Meyers in her own article for Kotaku meanwhile described her as wearing "an underboob-baring top that offers her breasts no support whatsoever", and further described the character's sexualization as "creepy" given she was established as a teenager in some of the games. She felt the character design as a result conflicted with her portrayal in the game of hoping to enlist men to aid her, stating that her outfit would add a layer of difficulty to succeeding in an ancient patriarchal society. Things were further compounded by the fact she was pursued by a man nine years her senior, giving her a storyline without the agency that would have helped justify her attire. What Meyers found further questionable was compared to characters like Ivy Valentine, Mi-na was considered more socially acceptable for public play due to her smaller breasts, while the former was often considered "problematic" despite both characters wearing similar attire.

The staff of Korean website Gamemeca cited the presence of Korean characters such as Mi-na as a highlight of the series, and observed negative fan response when they were excluded from Soulcalibur V. Kim Young-hoon in an article for the site emphasized that while Korean characters in video games are more common, they were a rarity around the time of Soul Edge's release. Describing Mi-na as a "refreshing culture shock", he appreciated how daring her attire was particularly her dress, and enjoyed that she remained popular even as the series went on, still considering her a favorite even as other Korean characters were added to the series. In another article however, he pointed out that while her outfit was meant to be a hanbok, it did not resemble one until far later in the series, and stated that its earlier versions created some controversies for being "overly sensational" with its exposure.

=== Academic analysis ===
University of Delaware Professor Rachael Hutchinson in the book Transnational Contexts of Culture, Gender, Class, and Colonialism in Play described Mi-na as highly sexualized, often portrayed in artwork for the game with an open mouth which she felt both suggested shouting for an attack and a sexual invite for readers of shōen Japanese media. Hutchinson further pointed out that Mi-na's outfits often incorporated bright colors compared to other characters, as well as an emphasis on the attractiveness of her face. Attention was also paid to the fact that while Mi-na had a similar physique to characters like Sophitia Alexandra in early titles, she showed a large amount of exposed skin, and while this was diminished somewhat in later games her breasts were now "almost bursting out of her shirt".

In terms of symbolism regarding Mi-na's design, she considered the exposed skin and sexualization a trend of how Korean characters were portrayed in the franchise, to help designate them as a cultural "Other" compared to the rest of the cast. Hutchinson further pointed out the nature of her weapon, considering it a phallic image with how as the series progressed it grew increasingly longer. Additionally, she felt that in light of the development team building the character around a chosen weapon, it was significant that the woman they designed was not only initially the youngest of the cast but also the shortest.

In her own book, Japanese Culture Through Videogames, Hutchison stated that the Asian characters in the series when examined as a set to look like characters from anime and manga, more specifically how Mina alongside Chai Xianghua resembled the bishōjo archetype. She further state that by comparison, the pair were portrayed as smaller and more 'feminine' than the Western female characters. Additional attention was given to the fact they featured reddish hair to help illustrate their Otherness, playing into the Japanese stereotype of foreigners being "red haired barbarians", or ketō.
