= Kayane =

French journalist and electronic sports player

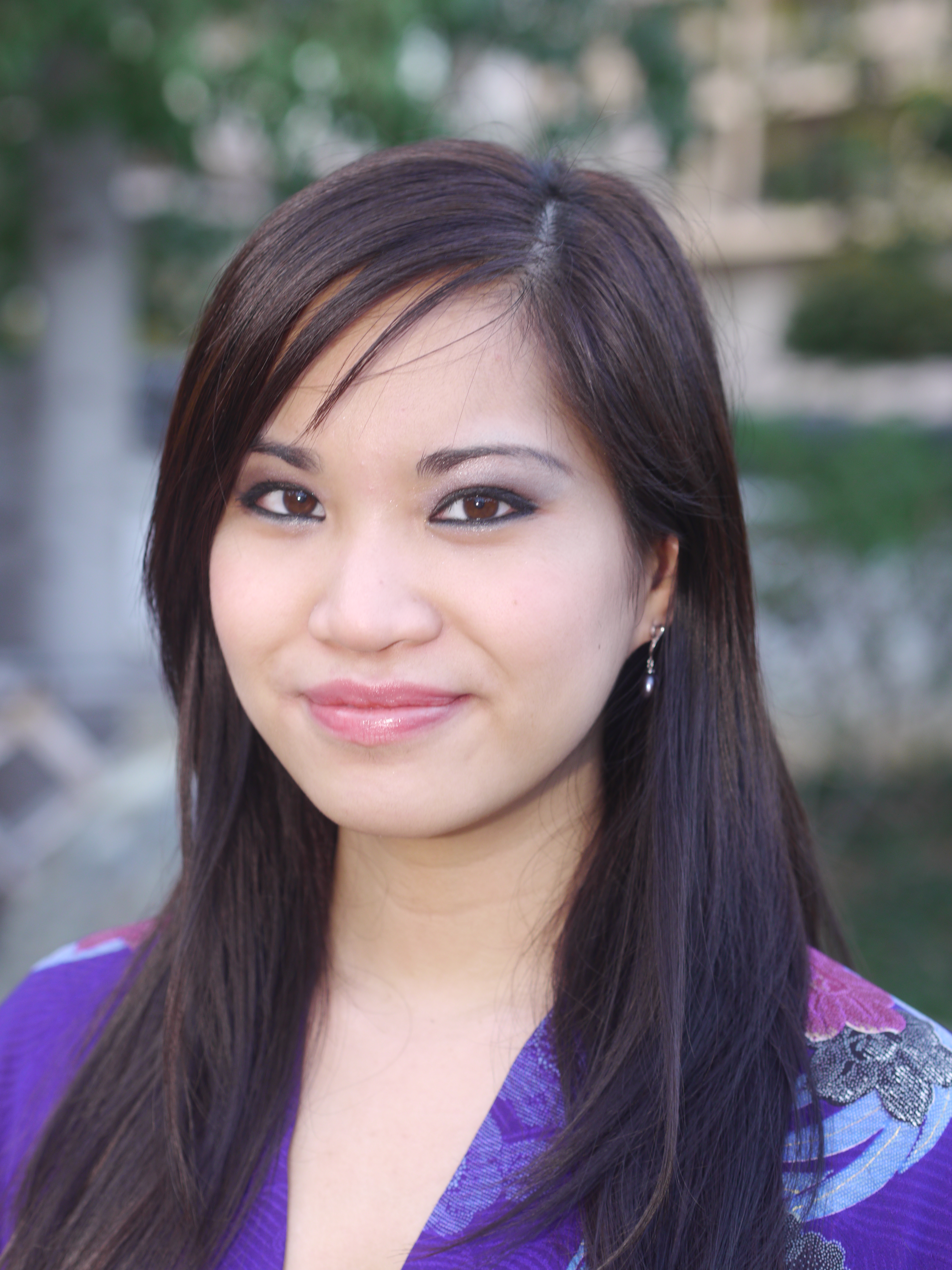
- Kayane at Monaco Anime Game Show 2013

Personal information
- Name: Marie-Laure Norindr
- Born: 17 June 1991 (age 35); Paris, France
- Nationality: French

Current team
- Team: Red Bull
- Games: Dead or Alive; Soulcalibur; Street Fighter; Tekken

Career information
- Playing career: 2001–present

Marie-Laure Norindr (born 17 June 1991), also known as Kayane (/ˈkaɪəneɪ/), is a French esports player and journalist. She specializes in fighting games, in particular in the Dead or Alive, Soulcalibur and Street Fighter series, and has been playing competitively since 2001. Since then, according to Guinness World Records in 2011, she has been the most successful female participant in fighting game tournaments, especially regarding the Soulcalibur games. She is currently sponsored by Red Bull.

== Biography ==
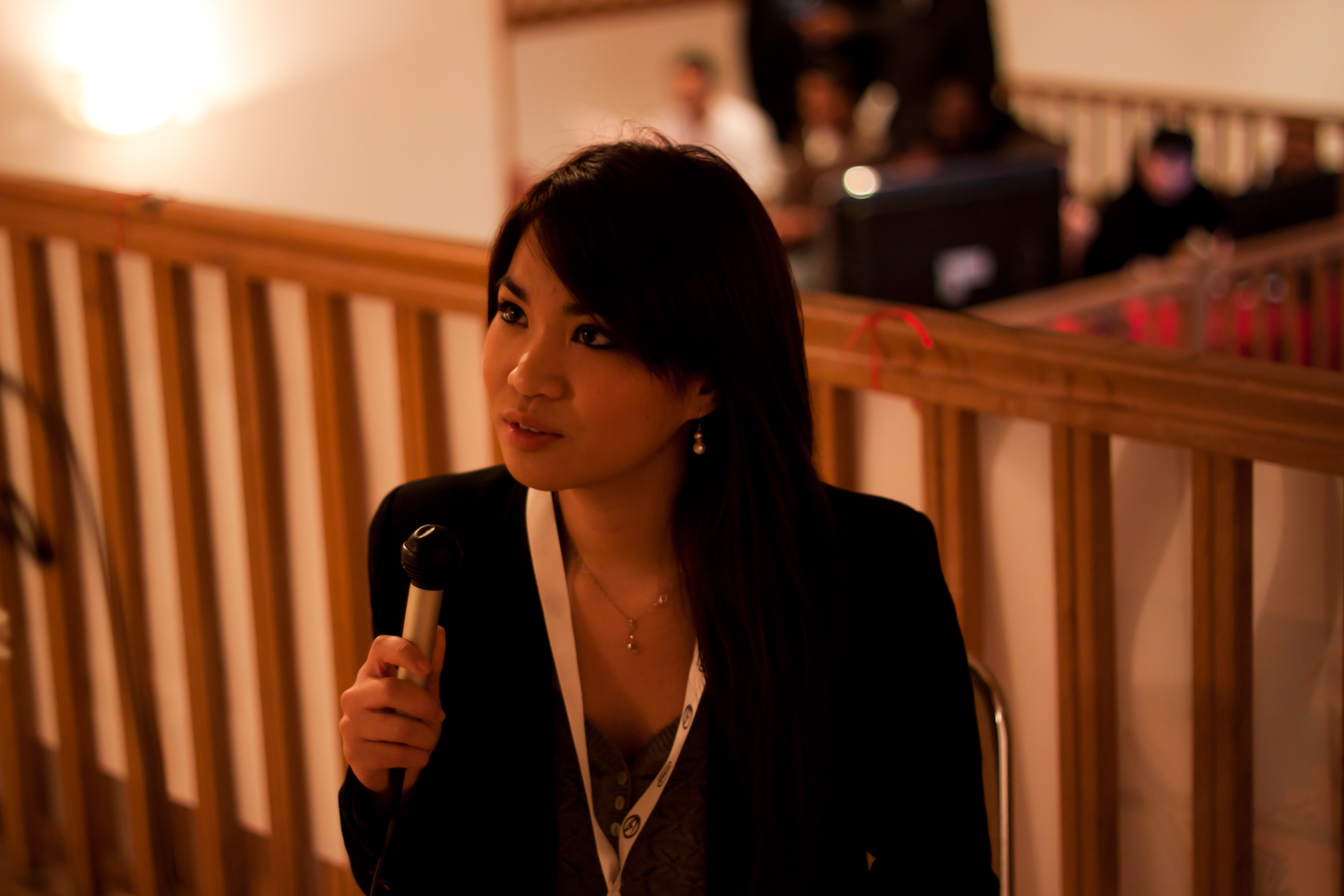
Kayane at Bushido International 2010

Marie-Laure Norindr was born on 17 June 1991 in Paris and grew up in Argenteuil, a north-western suburb. She is of Laotian and Vietnamese descent and her nickname Kayane comes from conjunction of the names of Dead or Alive characters Kasumi and Ayane.

Kayane has played video games since her early childhood, interested in a variety of genres. In 2001, she won the second place in France's vice-champion in Dead or Alive 2 at an age of nine; it was the first tournament that she has ever participated in. Since then, she has competed in scores of gaming competitions in France and around the world (more than 80 by 2012), winning many of them; her Major League Gaming record includes second place in Soulcalibur V in 2012. She has been a member of the Mad Catz pro gaming team and was sponsored by eLive.pro. In 2014, Kayane became the first electronic athlete from France to be sponsored by Red Bull.

Kayane has co-organized various gaming events (including charity events and "Kayane Session" events), became a brand ambassador for the French Soulcalibur V launch event and advertisement campaign, and worked as an esports writer and journalist. Since October 2013, she has been co-hosting the TV show Game One e-Sports on French television channel Game One. As of 2012, Norindr has been studying business; she said she sees herself in esports for ten more years "before starting a family." In 2020 she started a series of French Soulcalibur VI tournaments titled Kayane Cup. In April 2021 she co-hosted the WePlay eSports Ultimate Fighting League Soulcalibur VI event, a high-profile invitational hosted in Kyiv.

== Accolades ==
In 2012, Kayane entered Guinness World Records in the categories "First Female Super Street Fighter IV World Champion" (EVO 2010, playing as Chun-Li, regarded by Kayane as a personal role model) and "Most Podium Placements in a Fighting-Game Tournament for a Female (2001–2011)". According to Guinness, she has been ranked top three in 42 fighting games tournaments by 2011. Guinness World Records Gamer's Edition also awarded her the title of "Most Successful Female SoulCalibur Player" for her 48 Soulcalibur series podium placements between 2002 and 2012.

In 2009, Namco created a tribute AI named "Kayane" for the character Xianghua (Kayane's favourite Soulcalibur character) in Soulcalibur: Broken Destiny, imitating Kayane's playing style. A character named "Kayane" appeared in 2012's Soulcalibur V. In 2012, Forbes called Kayane "the most consistently successful female fighting game competitor of the 21st century," and French magazine Le Point called her the "queen of fighters"; in 2013, Complex included her beating members of the audience without looking at the screen among the "most incredible performances in video games".

== Tournament record ==
Tournaments and championships record

Year	Tournament	Game	Location	Place
2019	North East Championships	Soulcalibur VI	Lancaster, PA, United States	13
2019	Ultimate Fighting Arena	Soulcalibur VI	Saint-Denis, France	5
2019	Celtic Throwdown	Soulcalibur VI	(Republic of Ireland) Dublin, Ireland	1
2019	Evolution Championship Series	Soulcalibur VI	Las Vegas, United States	7
2018	Evolution Championship Series	Soulcalibur VI	Las Vegas, United States	5
2014	DreamHack Winter 2014	Ultra Street Fighter IV	Jönköping, Sweden	9
2013	Xbox One Tour	Killer Instinct	Paris, France	1
2013	Japan Arcade Team 3v3	Soulcalibur V	Tokyo, Japan	3
2013	EVO 2013 Side Event	Soulcalibur V	Las Vegas, United States	7
2012	Stun Academy	Dead or Alive 5	Paris, France	5
2012	E3 2012 - IGN Pro League	Dead or Alive 5	Los Angeles, United States	5
2012	Super Arcade USA Tougeki Qualifications	Soulcalibur V	Los Angeles, United States	1
2012	Bar Fight	Soulcalibur V	Philadelphia, United States	2
2012	CEO	Soulcalibur V	Orlando, United States	2
2012	Major League Gaming Summer Championship	Soulcalibur V	Los Angeles, United States	2
2012	Major League Gaming Spring Arena (TOP8 Tournament)	Soulcalibur V	New York City, United States	3
2012	Soul Arena #6	Soulcalibur V	Paris, France	2
2012	Soul Arena #4	Soulcalibur V	Paris, France	2
2012	Stunfest (Team Tournament)	Soulcalibur V	Rennes, France	2
2012	Major League Gaming Winter Championship	Soulcalibur V	Columbus, United States	7
2012	World Game Cup (World Team Tournament as Team France)	Soulcalibur V	Cannes, France	1
2012	World Game Cup (Team Tournament)	Soulcalibur V	Cannes, France	1
2012	World Game Cup (Solo Tournament)	Soulcalibur V	Cannes, France	5
2012	SoulCalibur V Launch Event	Soulcalibur V	Paris, France	1
2012	SoulCalibur V Official Qualifier Tournament for French Finals	Soulcalibur V	Paris, France	1
2011	World Game Cup 3v3	Super Street Fighter IV	Cannes, France	2
2011	World Game Cup (Solo Master Series)	Super Street Fighter IV	Cannes, France	3
2011	World Game Cup 3v3	Soulcalibur IV	Cannes, France	2
2011	World Game Cup 5v5	Soulcalibur IV	Cannes, France	3
2011	World Game Cup (Solo Tournament)	Soulcalibur IV	Cannes, France	Top 8
2011	Beat By Contest World (Solo Tournament)	Super Street Fighter IV	Lausanne, Switzerland	Top 11
2011	Beat By Contest World (Team Tournament)	Super Street Fighter IV	Lausanne, Switzerland	Top 16
2010	Bushido Impact XIV Team 2vs2	Super Street Fighter IV	Paris, France	3
2010	Super Versus Battle Team (European Tournament)	Soulcalibur IV	London, United Kingdom	2
2010	Super Versus Battle Team (European Tournament)	Super Street Fighter IV	London, United Kingdom	3
2010	EVO Women Invitational (World Tournament)	Super Street Fighter IV	Las Vegas, United States	1
2010	Stunfest	Soulcalibur IV	Rennes, France	4
2010	Gnouz Ranking 1 Saison 3	Soulcalibur IV	Paris, France	8
2010	World Game Cup	Soulcalibur IV	Cannes, France	9
2010	Bushido Nibaï Impact 3	Soulcalibur IV	Paris, France	1
2010	Bushido Impact 2 Saison 1	Soulcalibur IV	Paris, France	4
2009	Bushido Impact 1 Saison 1 Team	Soulcalibur IV	Paris, France	1
2009	Bushido Impact 1 Saison 1	Soulcalibur IV	Paris, France	7
2009	Gnouz Ranking 6 Saison 2	Soulcalibur IV	Paris, France	9
2009	Gnouz Ranking 5 Saison 2	Soulcalibur IV	Paris, France	1
2009	Cup Console Sports League	Soulcalibur IV	Paris, France	1
2009	Game in Chelles	Soulcalibur IV	Paris, France	4
2009	Gnouz Ranking Resurrection	Soulcalibur IV	Paris, France	5
2009	Evolution (World Solo Tournament)	Soulcalibur IV	Las Vegas, United States	9
2009	Nationals (World Tournament)	Soulcalibur IV	Denver, United States	17
2009	Internationals (World Tournament)	Soulcalibur IV	Denver, United States	7
2008	Gnouz Ranking 3 Saison 2 Team	Soulcalibur IV	Paris, France	1
2008	Gnouz Ranking 3 Saison 2 Solo	Soulcalibur IV	Paris, France	3
2008	Gnouz Ranking 2 Saison 2 Team	Soulcalibur IV	Paris, France	2
2008	Gnouz Ranking 2 Saison 2 Solo	Soulcalibur IV	Paris, France	5
2008	Gnouz Ranking 1 Saison 2	Soulcalibur IV	Paris, France	9
2008	Japan Expo	Soulcalibur IV	Paris, France	2
2007	Gnouz Ranking 5 Saison 1	Soulcalibur III	Paris, France	3
2007	Gnouz Ranking 4 Saison 1	Soulcalibur III	Paris, France	3
2007	Gnouz Ranking 3 Saison 1	Soulcalibur III	Paris, France	5
2007	Gnouz Ranking 2 Saison 1	Soulcalibur III	Paris, France	1
2007	Gnouz Ranking 1 Saison 1	Soulcalibur III	Paris, France	1
2007	E-games	Soulcalibur III	Toulouse, France	1
2006	World Game Cup World (Solo Tournament)	Soulcalibur III	Cannes, France	3
2006	World Game Cup World (Team Tournament)	Soulcalibur III	Cannes, France	2
2006	Gnouz Calibur Contest	Soulcalibur III	Paris, France	2
2005	World Championship	Soulcalibur II	Paris, France	1
2004	World Game Cup (World Solo Tournament)	Soulcalibur II	Cannes, France	4
2004	World Game Cup (World Team Tournament As a Team France member)	Soulcalibur II	Cannes, France	2
2004	Japan Expo	Soulcalibur II	Paris, France	2
2004	World Cyber Games	Soulcalibur II	Paris, France	2
2004	Event	Soulcalibur II	Paris, France	1
2004	Esiée	Soulcalibur II	Paris, France	1
2003	World Cup	Soulcalibur II	Paris, France	2
2003	Cartoonist (Team Tournament)	Soulcalibur II	Paris, France	1
2003	Japan Expo	Soulcalibur II	Paris, France	3
2002	Salon de l'imaginaire	Soulcalibur	Paris, France	3
2002	World Championship (Solo Tournament)	Soulcalibur	Paris, France	1
2002	World Championship (Team Tournament)	Soulcalibur	Paris, France	1
2002	Fan Festival (Team Tournament)	Soulcalibur	Paris, France	1
2002	Fan Festival (Solo Tournament)	Soulcalibur	Paris, France	2
2001	Epita	Dead or Alive 2	Paris, France	2
2001	BD Expo	Dead or Alive 2	Paris, France	2
