= Kōsei Hirota =

Japanese voice actor (born 1951)

Kōsei Hirota (廣田 行生, Hirota Kōsei; born February 12, 1951) is a Japanese voice actor.

== Filmography ==
=== Television animation ===
- Detective Conan (1997) (Tequila, Nagato Hideomi)
- Neo Ranga (1998) (Samuel)
- Cowboy Bebop (1999) (Udai Taxim)
- Turn A Gundam (1999) (Quoatl)
- The Legend of Condor Hero (2001) (Narration)
- Beyblade V-Force (2002) (Zagard)
- Full Metal Panic! (2002) (Master Sailor)
- Heat Guy J (2002) (Valtat Jurgens)
- Kiddy Grade (2002) (Admiral)
- Bleach (2005) (Onabara Gengoro)
- Naruto (2005) (Gosunkugi)
- Digimon Savers (2006) (Merukimon)
- Musashi Gundoh (2006) (Dabi-no-ji)
- Higurashi When They Cry (2006) (Mion's Father)
- Dinosaur King (2008) (Blackbeard)
- Golgo 13 (2008) (Whitney)
- Michiko & Hatchin (2008) (City Official)
- Spice and Wolf II (2009) (Arnold)
- Gon (2012) (Kai)
- One Piece (2012) (Shuzo)
- Beast Saga (2013) (Al Dile)
- Kill la Kill (2013) (Takiji Kuroido)
- Captain Earth (2014) (Jack)
- One Piece (2014) (Hack)
- Assassination Classroom (2016) (Principal Matsukata)
- Brave Witches (2016) (Klaus Mannerheim) (ep. 4, 11-12)
- Princess Principal (2017) (Danny MacBean "Dorothy's father", Beatrice (Imitation Voice (other by Fukushi Ochiai, Motomu Kiyokawa, Tessho Genda, Hiroya Ishimaru) "Danny MacBean"))) (ep. 6)
- Hakata Tonkotsu Ramens (2018) (Genzō Gohda)
- Night Head 2041 (2021) (Losyukov)
- Undead Girl Murder Farce (2023) (Ganimard)
- The Witch and the Beast (2024) (Farmus)

=== Animated films ===
- Redline (2009) (Roboworld President)
- King of Thorn (2010) (The Senator/Alexandro Pecchino)
- Crayon Shin-chan: Burst Serving! Kung Fu Boys ~Ramen Rebellion~ (2018)

=== Video games ===
- Crash Nitro Kart (2003) (Krunk)
- Halo (2007) (Sergeant Johnson)
- Devil May Cry 4: Special Edition (2015) (Bael & Dagon)
- Resident Evil 7: Biohazard (2017) (Joe Baker)

Unknown date

- Bravely Default (Hayreddin Barbarossa)
- Bravely Second (Hayreddin Barbarossa)
- Gears of War (Marcus Fenix)
- Soulcalibur: Broken Destiny (Nightmare)
- Soulcalibur Legends (Nightmare)
- Soulcalibur IV (Nightmare)

=== Tokusatsu ===
- Megaloman (1979) (ep. 28)
- Kaizoku Sentai Gokaiger (2011) (Bongan) (ep. 2)
- Thermae Romae II (2014) (Romani)

=== Dubbing roles ===
==== Live-action ====
- Danny Trejo
  - Point Blank (Wallace)
  - Bubble Boy (Slim)
  - Spy Kids (Isador "Machete" Cortez)
  - Spy Kids 2: The Island of Lost Dreams (Isador "Machete" Cortez)
  - Spy Kids 3-D: Game Over (Isador "Machete" Cortez)
  - Urban Justice (El Chivo)
  - Breaking Bad (Tortuga)
  - Bones (Bishop)
  - Death Race 2 (Goldberg)
  - Machete (Machete Cortez)
  - Predators (Cuchillo)
  - Recoil (Drake Salgado)
  - Bad Ass (Frank Vega)
  - Death Race 3: Inferno (Goldberg)
  - Dead in Tombstone (Guerrero De La Cruz)
  - Machete Kills (Machete Cortez)
  - Bad Asses (Frank Vega)
  - In the Blood (Big Biz)
  - 3-Headed Shark Attack (Mike Burns)
  - Dora and the Lost City of Gold (Boots)
  - The SpongeBob Movie: Sponge on the Run (El Diablo)
- The 13th Warrior (Helfdane (Clive Russell))
- 15 Minutes (Det. Leon Jackson (Avery Brooks))
- Alice in Wonderland (Bayard Hamar the Bloodhound (Timothy Spall))
- Alice Through the Looking Glass (Bayard Hamar the Bloodhound (Timothy Spall))
- Asteroid (1997 TV Asahi edition) (General Symons)
- The Big Hit (Paris (Avery Brooks))
- Black Book (Günther Franken (Waldemar Kobus))
- Bunraku (Nicola "The Woodcutter" (Ron Perlman))
- The Butterfly Effect 3: Revelations (Harry Goldburg)
- Charade (2004 DVD edition) (Tex Panthollow (James Coburn))
- A Civil Action (John Riley (Dan Hedaya))
- Daddy Day Camp (Colonel Buck Hinton (Richard Gant))
- A Dog of Flanders (William the Blacksmith (Bruce McGill))
- Don't Look Up (Benedict Drask (Ron Perlman))
- Drive (Nino 'Izzy' Paolozzi (Ron Perlman))
- The Fifth Element (General Munro (Brion James))
- Ford v Ferrari (Henry Ford II (Tracy Letts))
- Gangster Squad (Chief Bill Parker (Nick Nolte))
- The Glimmer Man (1999 TV Asahi edition) (Donald Cunningham (John M. Jackson))
- Guardians of the Galaxy Vol. 2 (Taserface (Chris Sullivan))
- Harry Potter and the Deathly Hallows – Part 1 (Death Eater Yaxley (Peter Mullan))
- Hearts Beat Loud (Dave (Ted Danson))
- Infernal Affairs (Wong Chi-shing (Anthony Wong))
- Knockin' on Heaven's Door (Henk (Thierry Van Werveke))
- Lock, Stock and Two Smoking Barrels (Big Chris (Vinnie Jones))
- The Lone Ranger (Butch Cavendish (William Fichtner))
- Mercury Rising (Special Agent Tommy Jordan (Chi McBride))
- The Messenger: The Story of Joan of Arc (Jean de Dunois (Tchéky Karyo))
- National Security (Nash (Eric Roberts))
- Nightmare Alley (Bruno (Ron Perlman))
- Nobody (Eddie Williams (Michael Ironside))
- Norbit (Big Black Jack Latimore (Terry Crews))
- Our Family Wedding (Bradford Boyd (Forest Whitaker))
- Pirates of the Caribbean: On Stranger Tides (Gunner (DeObia Oparei))
- Platoon (2003 TV Tokyo edition) (Rhah (Francesco Quinn))
- Pumpkinhead: Ashes to Ashes (Ed Harley (Lance Henriksen))
- The Quiet Man (2017 Star Channel edition) (Squire "Red" Will Danaher (Victor McLaglen))
- Rage (Detective St. John (Danny Glover))
- Same Kind of Different as Me (Earl Hall (Jon Voight))
- SEAL Team 8: Behind Enemy Lines (Ricks (Tom Sizemore))
- Seraphim Falls (Hayes (Michael Wincott))
- Seven (2001 TV Asahi edition) (District Attorney Martin Talbot (Richard Roundtree))
- Shanghai Noon (Marshal Nathan Van Cleef (Xander Berkeley))
- Snatch (Bullet Tooth Tony (Vinnie Jones))
- Snatch (2017 Blu-Ray edition) (Abraham "Cousin Abe" Denovitz (Dennis Farina))
- True Grit ("Lucky" Ned Pepper (Barry Pepper))
- The Unknown Woman (Muffa (Michele Placido))
- Vehicle 19 (Detective Smith (Gys de Villiers))
- Veronica Guerin (John Traynor (Ciarán Hinds))
- The Watcher (Hollis (Chris Ellis))

==== Animation ====
- The Addams Family 2 (Big Bad Ronny)
- Batman: The Brave and the Bold (Joe Chill)
- The Spectacular Spider-Man (Tombstone)
- Spider-Man: The Animated Series (J. Jonah Jameson)
- Spider-Man Unlimited (J. Jonah Jameson)
- Surf's Up 2: WaveMania (Undertaker)
