= Chai Xianghua =

Fictional character

Xianghua
- Soulcalibur character
- Xianghua in Soulcalibur IV
- First game: Soulcalibur (1998)
- Designed by: Koji Mitsunaga
- Voiced by: English: Wendee Lee; Japanese: Aya Hisakawa (Soulcalibur I–III) Ryōko Shintani (Soulcalibur IV) Aya Suzaki (Soulcalibur VI)

In-universe information
- Weapon: Jian
- Origin: Peking, Ming Empire
- Nationality: Chinese

Chai Xianghua (Japanese: チャイ・シャンファ, Hepburn: Chai Shanfa), better known as just Xianghua, is a fictional character and jianke in the Soulcalibur series of historical fantasy fighting games by Namco who was introduced in Soulcalibur in 1998.

== Conception and design ==
As a character introduced in Soulcalibur, Xianghua's weaponry, a Chinese sword designed to be unique amongst the other weapons in the game, was selected before other elements of the character. Her design and concept were then built to revolve around it, starting with gender, then physical measurements, and lastly background details. As the development team had decided to include Chinese martial arts motion capture, and the person performing them was female, they chose to add a "cute girl" aspect to the character design. Several concepts were developed by character designer Koji Mitsunaga. Afterwards, her character was rendered as a 3D model by a design team that worked solely on her.

During development, an idea was considered to instead change directions and have her fight with martial arts, utilizing kicks and creating "vacuum wave" attacks with her arms, before returning to the original concept. Xianghua was designed around a theme of a traveling entertainer's flexibility, as well as a Chinese motif. Many different designs were considered during development, such as a girl in an apron dress or another in horse riding attire, with the development team noting despite the variety the hairstyle was kept consistently "reminiscent of Xianghua." Emphasis was done to make her feel 'light' in terms of movement, based on Chinese martial arts, and finding that balance in the design was an active concern for her design process.

Different styles of her sword were also considered before settling on a jian, which was meant to compliment her martial arts movements and give a sense of speed to help portray her as a dynamic woman. An idea was jokingly suggested for a "soul bug" to live in the hilt that would have acted as a medium to draw the wielder's energy into liquid within the sword. Developer notes on the concept stated "It was a disgusting weapon."

== Appearances ==
Xianghua was introduced in the 1998 video game Soulcalibur, tasked by the emperor of China to locate a weapon called the "Hero's Sword", and to this end posed as a member of a traveling circus troupe. Along the way they encounter others searching for the sword, namely Kilik who informs them that the sword is in fact a sentient evil blade called "Soul Edge". Upon defeating the sword's wielder they were pulled into an ethereal void and fought the embodiment of the sword's spirit, Inferno. During the fight Xianghua's own sword revealed itself to be "Soulcalibur", Soul Edge's antithesis, and with it they were able to defeat Inferno though lost Soulcailbur while trying to escape the void. Later upon discovering fragments of Soul Edge still survived, she traveled again with Kilik seeking to destroy it for good. Though the two become separated, she bears him a child, Xiba, and in an arranged marriage to a Chinese general has another, Leixia.

In print media, Xianghua appears in the Soulcalibur Hong Kong manhua retelling of the game. Encountering a group of lizardmen, humans mutated into crazed anthropomorphic lizards due to Soul Edge's influence, she is rescued by Kilik. Her sword at this point suddenly transforms into Soulcalibur, and instantly destroys the lizardmen.

== Promotion and reception ==
To promote the character, Namco has released Xianghua figures in Japan by a variety of manufacturers, including Duck Tail, Epoch, Wave, and Yujin. As a tribute for the acclaimed Soulcalibur player Kayane, whose favourite character was Xianghua, Namco created a tribute AI named "Kayane" in Soulcalibur: Broken Destiny, imitating her playing style.

Xianghua has been well received since debut. Jesse Schedeen of IGN compared her to martial arts heroes of kung fu films such as Crouching Tiger, Hidden Dragon, noting the similarity in how they were often portrayed as reliant on their legacy, while adding that it was "too bad none of these ancient heroes looked half as good". He added that while she was more traditional in some regards, her attire was far from it, with her Soulcalibur IV design resembling a "hodgepodge of different Oriental fashions that come together in one sexy look". Julia Cook of Paste described her as one of the best dressed female characters in video games, praising her "tight outfits with flowy, feminine accoutrements", while with Soulcalibur IV her appearance shifted to a more masculine outfit. The staff of Dreamcast Magazine considered one of the best female characters on the related console, describing her as having "oriental flavour to her moves and style", and being a capable warrior despite looking "sweet and innocent".

Lee Dawn for Gamemeca cited Xianghua as one of the icons of the Soulcalibur series, and considered her romance with Kilik to be one of the exciting highlights of its storyline. However, complaints were raised regarding her absence in Soulcalibur V, calling her marriage reminiscent of a "last-minute drama". They considered it one of the necessary reasons for the franchise's eventual reboot, welcoming her return and more youthful appearance in Soulcalibur VI. Paste on the other hand praised her exit from the series, stating that despite being "knocked up" by Kilik, they felt she left honorably as a "revered warrior and wife of a prestigious general".

=== In academic analysis ===
University of Delaware professor Rachel Hutchinson cited Xianghua as an example of stereotypical designs in Japanese media, noting unlike the male asian characters she was designed to be smaller and less threatening, describing her as representative of bishōjo design. She also noted that as the series progressed her appearance invoked less Chinese imagery and became more feminized, drawing a parallel to how other prominent female characters in the franchise became more sexualized, adding that the action poses and open mouth both suggested shouting for an attack and a sexual invite for readers of shōen Japanese media.

In her own book, Japanese Culture Through Videogames, Hutchison stated that the Asian characters in the series when examined as a set to look like characters from anime and manga, more specifically how Mina alongside Seong Mi-na resembled the bishōjo archetype. She further state that by comparison, the pair were portrayed as smaller and more 'feminine' than the Western female characters. Additional attention was given to the fact they featured reddish hair, which in Xinaghua's case grew more prominent as the series progressed. She felt this use of red helped illustrate them as the cultural "Other" in the eyes of Japanese viewers, playing into their stereotype of foreigners being "red haired barbarians", or ketō.

Professors Brenda Ayres and Sarah E. Maier book A Vindication of the Redhead also examined Xianghua's red haircolor in regards to portraying a character as the "Other", drawing a further correlation to her "huge breasts". They argued both were often associated with foreign cultures almost exclusively in Japan prior to World War II, and only after the war did they become a more common sight amongst black-haired Japanese women in an attempt to appeal to Western audiences due to the influence of American soldiers interacting with their culture.
