= Queen's Gate (gamebook) =

Japanese game book series

- Cover of the first Queen's Gate gamebook released by Hobby Japan featuring Alice

クイーンズゲイト (Kuīnzu Geito)
- Genre: Action, Adventure, Fantasy
- Novel series
- Written by: Eiji Okita; Eiichi Shitara
- Illustrated by: Niθ; Kanko Nakamura
- Published by: Kenkyūsha
- Original run: April 1, 2009 – July 1, 2009
- Volumes: 3
- Video game

Queen's Gate: Spiral Chaos
- Developer: Bandai Namco Games
- Publisher: Bandai Namco Games
- Genre: RPG
- Platform: PlayStation Portable
- Released: July 28, 2011

Queen's Gate (Japanese: クイーンズゲイト, Hepburn: Kuīnzu Geito) is a series of visual combat books published by Hobby Japan. The supplement to the Queen's Blade series, it features licensed female characters from other games and works, including those from Hobby Japan. Like Queen's Blade before it, it is also compatible with Flying Buffalo's Lost Worlds gamebooks. The first gamebook, featuring Alice, was released on November 30, 2007, with a total of nineteen gamebooks released as of June 29, 2012. A novel adaptation by Eiji Okita and Eiichi Shitara was published by Kenkyusha from April to July 2009. A video game adaptation of Queen's Gate was developed by Bandai Namco Games for the PlayStation Portable and released on July 28, 2011.

== Plot ==
In the original game, the general story comes from Alice's bio: she is a treasure hunter who one day discovers the "Queen's Gate", which unleashes a battle across space-time.

In the novels, the plot is expanded a little more (though characters from other franchises do not appear), introducing her rival Dorothy, Alice's mother Lewis, and Dorothy's mother Glinda, as they fight against various monsters.

== Characters ==
Alice (門を開く者 アリス, Mon o Hiraku Mono Arisu; "Gate Opener Alice")
Voiced by: Kana Ueda
An original character from Nitroplus who wields a pair of modified Mauser C96 pistols with built-in combat knives and a whip that she wears as a tail. The pistols are called Angra Mainyu (アンリ・マンユ, Anri Manyu) and Aeshma (アエーシェマ, Aēshema), for the black and silver one respectively. Illustrated by Niθ.
In the novels, she follows an Alice in Wonderland theme, as not only her mother is called Lewis, but she has a tactician expert subordinate called Hatter (帽子屋, Bōshiya), a subordinate expert in machinery dressed in a bunny girl costume called March Hare (三月兎, Sangatsu Usagi), and she belongs to the Dodgson Foundation (ドジソン財団, Dojison Zaidan).
Ink Nijihara (魔法少女 虹原 いんく, Mahō Shōjo Nijihara Inku; "Magical Girl Ink Nijihara")
Voiced by: Yukari Tamura
From the anime series Moetan. Illustrated by POP.
Iroha (恩を返すもの いろは, On o Kaesu Mono Iroha; "Repayer of Kindess Iroha")
Voiced by: Mayumi Shindō
From the Samurai Shodown video game series. Illustrated by Tasuku Iizuki.
Mai Shiranui (紅の忍 不知火 舞, Beni no Shinobi Shiranui Mai; "Crimson Ninja Mai Shiranui")
Voiced by: Ami Koshimizu
From The King of Fighters and Fatal Fury video game series. Illustrated by Mahiru Izumi.
Dizzy (運命の子 ディズィー, Unmei no Ko Dizwī; "Child of Fate Dizzy")
From the Guilty Gear video game series. Illustrated by Takumi Inoue.
Mina Majikina (聖弓の射手 真鏡名 ミナ, Hijiri Yumi no Shashu Majikina Mina; "Holy Archer Mina Majikina")
Voiced by: Rie Tanaka
From Samurai Shodown. Illustrated by Otsudo Shinozuki.
Cham Cham (密林(ジャングル)の守護者 チャムチャム, Janguru no Shugosha Chamu Chamu; "Jungle Guardian Cham Cham")
Voiced by: Eri Kitamura
From Samurai Shodown. Illustrated by BLADE.
Kasumi (運命のくノ一 かすみ, Unmei no Kunoichi Kasumi; "Kunoichi of Destiny Kasumi")
Voiced by: Houko Kuwashima
From the Dead or Alive video game series. Illustrated by Insert it's.
Lili (格闘令嬢 リリ, Kakutō Reijō Riri; "Fighting Lady Lili")
Voiced by: Rina Sato
From Tekken 5: Dark Resurrection. Illustrated by Meiwa Morita.
Katja (赤銅の人形遣い カーチャ, Shakudō no Ningyōtsukai Kācha; "Puppeteer of Copper Katja")
Voiced by: Aya Hirano
From The Qwaser of Stigmata. Illustrated by Hoods Entertainment.
Junko Hattori (一年A組委員長 服部 絢子, Ichi-nen A Gumi'iinchō Hattori Junko; "Class A Chairman Junko Hattori")
Voiced by: Yōko Hikasa
From the light novel and anime series Demon King Daimao. Illustrated by Zundarepon.
Jubei Yagyu (覚醒せし剣姫 柳生 十兵衛, Kakusei Seshi Kenhime Yagyū Jubee; "Awakened Sword Princess Jubei Yagyu")
Voiced by: Aoi Yūki
From the light novel and anime series Hyakka Ryōran Samurai Girls. Illustrated by Mahiru Izumi.
Ivy (絡みつく孤高の刃 アイヴィー, Karamitsuku Kokō no Ha Aivī; "Twisting Blade of Solitude Ivy")
Voiced by: Yumi Tōma
From the Soulcalibur series. Illustrated by 2-go.
Yukimura Sanada (剣姫軍師 真田 幸村, Kenhime Gunshi Sanada Yukimura; "Sword Princess Strategist Yukimura Sanada")
Voiced by: Rie Kugimiya
From Hyakka Ryōran Samurai Girls. Illustrated by Keitaro Arima.
Noel Vermillion (蒼の継承者 ノエル = ヴァーミリオン, Ao no Keishōsha Noeru Vāmirion; "Eye of the Azure Noel Vermillion")
Voiced by: Kanako Kondō
From the BlazBlue series. Illustrated by Nagi Takatsuki.
Taki (神速の封刃 タキ, Shinsoku no Fūha Taki; "Sealed Sword of Godspeed Taki")
From the Soulcalibur series. Illustrated by Isse.
Kanu (蜀の武神 関羽, Shu no Bushin Kan'u; "Warrior God of Shu Kanu")
From the Koihime Musō series. Illustrated by Takumi Inoue.
Pyrrha (蒼運命に翻弄される娘 ピュラ, Aoi Unmei ni Honrō Sareru Musume Pyura; "She Who Fights Destiny Pyrrha")
From Soulcalibur V. Illustrated by refeia.
Suchie-Pai (美少女雀士スーチーパイ, Bishōjo Janshi Sūchī-Pai; "Idol Fighter Suchie-Pai")
From the mahjong games Idol Janshi Suchie-Pai. Illustrated by Kenichi Sonoda.

== Video game characters ==
=== Protagonists ===
Maron Makaron (マジカルパティシエ まろん まかろん, Majikaru Patishie Maron Makaron; "Magical Pâtisstier Maron Makron")
Voiced by: Mai Nakahara
The main heroine of Queen's Gate: Spiral Chaos. Illustrated by Poyoyon Rock.
Painkiller Kotone (ペインキラー 琴音ちゃん, Peinkirā Kotone-chan)
Voiced by: Megumi Kojima
From the Hyper Nurse series. Illustrated by Junichi Inoue.
Wonder Momo (愛の戦士 ワンダーモモ, Ai no Senshi Wandā Momo; "Warrior of Love Wonder Momo")
Voiced by: Haruko Momoi
From the video game Wonder Momo. Illustrated by Poyoyon Rock.

=== Antagonists ===
Luna (うさぎんアイドル ルーナ, Usagin Aidoru Rūna; "Bunny Idol Luna")
Voiced by: Saki Fujita
Illustrated by Atsuko Ishida.
Eine (グラビティガンナー アイネ, Gurabiti Gannā Aine; "Gravity Gunner Eine")
Voiced by: Hisako Kanemoto
Illustrated by Keiji Gotoh.
Humina (戦場の死神 ヒュミナ, Senjō no Shinigami Hyumina; "Battlefield Death God Humina")
Voiced by: Kaoru Mizuhara
Illustrated by Makoto Koga.
Arutta Catus (ニャンダフルパティシエ アリュッタ カトゥス, Nyandafuru Patishie Aryutta Katusu; "Nyan-derful Pâtisstier Arutta Catus")
Voiced by: Asami Shimoda
Illustrated by Poyoyon Rock.

=== Gal Monsters ===
Audrey Plum (オードリィ プラム, Ōdoryi Puramu)
Voiced by: Rei Mitsuzaki
One of the Gal Monsters featured in the game. Illustrated by Y Nin.
Lovlila Ani (ラブリラ アニー, Raburira Anī)
Voiced by: Ayano Yamamoto
One of the Gal Monsters featured in the game. Illustrated by Shinichiro Otsuka.
Tenko (九尾の狐 天狐, Kyūbi no Kitsune Tenko; "Nine-Tailed Fox Tenko")
Voiced by: Kumi Tanaka
One of the Gal Monsters featured in the game. Illustrated by Makoto Koga.
Stella (剣竜鬼 ステラ, Kenryūki Sutera; "Dragon Sword Demon Stella")
Voiced by: Kana Akutsu
One of the Gal Monsters featured in the game. Illustrated by Muraneko.
Tino (照竜鬼 ティノ, Teryūki Tino; "Ghost Dragon Demon Tino")
Voiced by: Noriko Aoki
One of the Gal Monsters featured in the game. Illustrated by Muraneko.
Fairy Charlotte (フェアリー シャルロット, Fearī Sharurotto)
Voiced by: Hiromi Igarashi
One of the Gal Monsters featured in the game. Illustrated by Keiji Gotoh.

== Novel characters ==
=== Protagonists ===
Dorothy Loreena Baum (罠に触れぬ者ドロシー ロリーナ ボーム, Wana ni Fure nu Mono Doroshī Rorīna Bōmu; "Trap Avoider Dorothy Loreena Baum")
She is Alice's childhood friend, and became her rival as a treasure hunter in school. Although she isn't clever, she has the specific skill of not getting trapped ever, and she usually forestalls Alice. People call her a "good luck fairy". She follows a Wizard of Oz theme, as not only her mother is called Glinda, but she has a tactician expert subordinate called Scarecrow (スケアクロウ, Sukeakurō), an armored subordinate called Lumberjack (ランバージャック, Ranbājakku), a subordinate with leon genes expert in battle called Löwe (レーヴェ, Rēve), and she belongs to the Baum Foundation (ボーム財団, Bōm Zaidan). Illustrated by Niθ.

=== Dodgson Foundation ===
Hatter (帽子屋, Bōshiya)
March Hare (三月兎, Sangatsu Usagi)
Lewis (門に触れし者 ルイス, Mon ni Fureshi Mono Ruisu; "Gate Toucher Lewis")
Alice's mother. Her look is that of an intellectual woman, with glasses and a ponytail. A world-leading treasure hunter, she went missing when she discovered Queen's Gate. For weapons, she uses the double hatchet cannons Zarich (ザリチェ, Zariche) and Taurvi (タルウィ, Taruwi), two hand cannons whose tips end in huge hatchets. Although she prides herself in her gun using .600 Nitro Express rounds, 20 times the power of Alice's. Lewis can stand the terrible recoil even when firing it one-handed. Illustrated by Niθ.

=== Baum Foundation ===
Scarecrow (スケアクロウ, Sukeakurō)
Lumberjack (ランバージャック, Ranbājakku)
Löwe (レーヴェ, Rēve)
Glinda Baum (グリンダ, Gurinda)
Dorothy's mother. She once formed a duo with Alice's mother. Illustrated by Niθ.

=== Irukinuf's Cult ===
==== Queen Faction ====
Rin / Faye Wright
Leonidas
Al-Kāhinat
Zenobia
Alp Arslan
Irukinuf
Trump Soldiers

==== Tentacle King Faction ====
Rama
Musanna
Minamoto no Yorimitsu (源 頼光)
Hikita Bungoro (疋田 文五郎, Hikita Bungorō)
Moonlight
Harald
Finn McCool
Swodar Nyarmain

=== Other characters ===
Gate Watcher
Kwun

== Media ==
=== Gamebooks ===
- Alice – Released November 30, 2007.
  - A limited edition "Boost Version" of Alice was also released with the "Special Set" during Hobby Japan's 2011 MegaHobby Expo. It is now available in Hobby Japan's online shop.
- Ink Nijihara – Released November 30, 2007.
- Iroha – Released April 18, 2008.
- Mai Shiranui – Released October 31, 2008.
  - A limited-edition 2P version of Mai was released on May 23, 2009, with a limited edition PVC statuette by Volks.
- Dizzy – Released November 28, 2009.
- Mina Majikina – Released November 28, 2009.
- Cham Cham – Released February 27, 2010.
- Kasumi – Released February 27, 2010.
- Lili – Released April 30, 2010.
- Junko Hattori – Released June 25, 2010.
- Ekaterina "Katja" Kurae – Released June 25, 2010.
- Jubei Yagyu – Released September 30, 2010.
- Isabella "Ivy" Valentime – Released March 25, 2011.
- Yukimura Sanada – Released April 28, 2011.
- Noel Vermillion – Released August 12, 2011.
- Taki – Released September 30, 2011.
- Kanu – Released January 20, 2012.
- Pyrhha – Released March 17, 2012.
- Suchie-Pai – Released June 29, 2012.

=== Novel ===
A novel adaptation of Queen's Gate was written by Eiji Okita and Eiichi Shitara with illustrations by Niθ and Kanko Nakamura. Three volumes were published by Kenkyusha between April 1, 2009, and July 1, 2009.

No.	Title	Release date	ISBN
01	Queen's Gate: The Gate Opener (クイーンズゲイト(1) 門を開く者, Kuīnzu Geito(1): Mon o Hiraku Mono)	April 1, 2009	978-4-0590-3532-9
1. "Prologue: Treasure at the Submarine Temple"; 2. "Irukinuf's Songstress"; 3. "Reliable Friend?"; 4. "Fierce Fighting at the Academy"; 5. "Bird of the Touch of God"; 6. "Journey to a Different World"
02	Queen's Gate: The Time Traveler (クイーンズゲイト(2) 時を超える者, Kuīnzu Geito(2): Toki o Koeru Mono)	May 1, 2009	978-4-0590-3534-3
1. "Prologue: Change of the Ruler"; 2. "Hyperborea's Collapse"; 3. "Interlude: Two Traitors"; 4. "Field of Tentacles Edalb"; 5. "Interlude: Prince and Queen"; 6. "Fusion of Terror"; 7. "Interlude: The Queen's Return"; 8. "Irukinuf's Ambition"; 9. "Interlude: Samurai's Daisho, at the Ready"; 10. "Epilogue: Great Return"
03	Queen's Gate: The Gate Protector (クイーンズゲイト(3) 門を守る者, Kuīnzu Geito(3): Mon o Mamoru Mono)	July 1, 2009	978-4-0590-3535-0
1. "Prologue: A Shooting Star Crossing Through the Sky"; 2. "The Original One's Capabilities"; 3. "The Tentacle God Irukinuf's Revival"; 4. "Alice's Return"; 5. "Black Tower Revisited"; 6. "Epilogue: There Are No Special Days Without Routine"

=== Video game ===
A video game adaptation, titled Queen's Gate: Spiral Chaos (クイーンズゲイト スパイラルカオス, Kuīnzu Geito: Supiraru Kaosu), was developed by Bandai Namco Games for the PlayStation Portable. Released on July 28, 2011, the game is the sequel to Queen's Blade: Spiral Chaos, featuring characters from the Queen's Gate series as well as characters from the original series. Like the first game, Queen's Gate: Spiral Chaos also features an original storyline with game-exclusive characters. A limited-edition version of the game was also released, featuring a Maron Makaron figure from Figma.
