= Taki (Soulcalibur) =

- Soulcalibur character
- Taki in Soulcalibur II
- First game: Soul Edge (1996)
- Designed by: Koji Mitsunaga; Hideo Yoshie (SCIII onward); Mari Shimazaki (Lost Swords)
- Voiced by: English: Desirée Goyette (Soulcalibur II) Cynthia Holloway (Soulcalibur III - VI); Japanese: Fujiko Takimoto (Soul Edge - Soulcalibur III, Namco × Capcom) Sachiko Kojima (Soulcalibur Legends, Soulcalibur IV, Soulcalibur: Broken Destiny) Nanako Mori (Soulcalibur VI)

In-universe information
- Weapon: Ninjatō
- Origin: Fuma no Sato, Sengoku Japan
- Nationality: Japanese

Taki (Japanese: タキ) is a character in the Soulcalibur series of video games. Created by designers Aya Takemura and Takuji Kawano of Namco's Project Soul division, she was introduced in Soul Edge, and later appeared in almost every subsequent sequel. Taki is a Japanese demon-hunting kunoichi and the greatest warrior of the Fu-Ma ninja clan. She is traveling the world on a quest to destroy the cursed sword Soul Edge. Taki has been featured as a player character in every main entry in the series up until 2012's Soulcalibur V, when her place was taken by her own young disciple named Natsu, but she returned in 2018's Soulcalibur VI. She has further appeared in all of Soulcalibur spin-off games, as well as in some other titles such as Namco × Capcom, The King of Fighters All Star, and Queen's Gate. She has been voiced in Japanese by Fujiko Takimoto until Soulcalibur III, and then by Sachiko Kojima and Nanako Mori in later games, while her English voice actors include Desirée Goyette and Cynthia Holloway.

Taki has achieved significant popularity among fans of the series, especially in the West. She has received mostly positive feedback, often described as having iconic status in the series. She has been regarded as both one of the best female ninja characters in video games as well as a sex symbol of the fighting game genre. The emphasis on the character's sexuality in official media has led to mixed responses from critics, however, with some praising it while others feel it became excessive as the series progressed, namely due to the perception of her breast size increasing with each iteration of the franchise.

== Conception and development ==
As a character introduced in Soul Edge, Taki's weapon, a Japanese shortsword known as a ninjatō, was selected before other elements of the character and designed to be unique amongst the other weapons in the game. The character's concept was then built to revolve around it, starting with gender, then physical measurements, and lastly backstory. The finalized design was chosen out of multiple concepts created by character designer Koji Mitsunaga. Afterwards, her character was rendered as a 3D model by a design team that worked solely on her, and then animated using motion capture to create her in-game movements. In an interview, Soulcalibur III director Katsutoshi Sasaki regarded Taki as his personal favorite character from the series.

Taki's development was overseen by character designer Koji Mitsunaga. Originally, she was armed with just one blade in Soul Edge. However, while developing the game's sequel, Soulcalibur, after developing the character Ivy Valentine they felt she needed a female counterpart that would wield two blades. As they had not decided to bring back the previous game's dual-wielder, Cervantes de Leon, they chose Taki, deciding that her singular ninjatō "looked lonely". As a result she received a second blade, as they felt the concept of her having weapons that could actively dig into the opponents on hit would be interesting. In addition to ninjatō, weapons such as kunai are also available as alternatives for the player to equip during gameplay.

=== Design ===
Taki stands 170 centimetres (5 ft 7 in) tall, and has a bust size of 90 cm (35 in). During Soul Edge's development, several ideas were considered for her outfit, with a mask covering her face being a consistent theme between designs. At one point they took inspiration from another Namco character, Yoshimitsu, but they felt the result was too masculine. When showing her face, the developers wanted her to display little emotion as a ninja. Significant attention was paid to her backside in the concept art phase, with the team wanting to emphasize her "slender body and ample bust". To this end they gave her an outfit that emphasized the contours of her body to "give her a sharper look", while also illustrating an ease of movement.

Though other designs such as a leotard were considered as the series progressed, her outfit tended to remain a red bodysuit with various degrees of armor, such as oni masks which were meant to represent a symbol of exorcism. When developing Soulcalibur III, the art team was instructed to differentiate the character designs from those in previous games. Artist Hideo Yoshie oversaw her design from Soulcalibur III onward, and utilized various patterns and coloration on her outfit. In Soulcalibur VI, Japanese text from her ninja clan was added in bright pink highlights across her bodysuit.

In addition to the aforementioned emphasis on Taki's sexual attributes, in several pieces of artwork for the character her nipples are prominently visible through the bodysuit. Additionally, among the multiple alternate outfits she has had throughout the series, while several were designed around a kunoichi theme, many others leaned into fanservice, such as maid clothes and a wolf-themed magical armor. One in particular, designed for Soulcalibur: Lost Swords by Bayonetta character designer Mari Shimazaki, was a revealing outfit called "SC Woman". Inspired by American comic book superheroines, it left large areas of her torso and breasts exposed.

== Appearances ==
Introduced in the 1996 video game Soul Edge, Taki is a ninja from the Fu-Ma clan. Known as a demon hunter trying to purge the land of evil, she originally seeks a cursed sword, Soul Edge, to help her destroy it. However, upon encountering the sword's wielder, Cervantes, they battle and Taki helps fellow character Sophitia defeat him, destroying one half of the blade in the process. While searching for the remaining shards of the sword to finish it off, several members of her clan become corrupted by its influence, including the clan's master Toki, who she defeats after he transforms into a demon. Taki appears in every entry of the Soulcalibur series with the exception of Soulcalibur V, where the development team felt she was "too old" to continue being a ninja. Instead she was written as chasing after a revived Toki while her pupil, Natsu, took over her role for the game. Taki was later brought back for Soulcalibur VI, a retelling of the events of the first Soulcalibur. In Japanese she was voiced by Fujiko Takimoto until Soulcalibur IV, after which she was voiced by Sachiko Kojima and later Nanako Mori for her Soulcalibur VI appearance. Meanwhile, in English the character was voiced by Desirée Goyette, with Cynthia Holloway voicing her from Soulcalibur III onwards.

Outside of the Soulcalibur series, Taki appears as a playable character in the 2005 crossover tactical role-playing game Namco × Capcom. In 2022, Taki was one of several characters added to The King of Fighters All Star as part of the game's crossover event with the Soulcalibur franchise. She was also featured in a gamebook for the ecchi series Queen's Blade, which utilized a stylized version of her Soulcalibur IV character design.

== Promotion and merchandise ==
Namco released a Taki key chain figurine and a standing clock in its 1996 Soul Edge line, among other items such as window shades and table mats. Her default costume from Soulcalibur IV was made available as free downloadable content for the player character Estelle in the action role-playing game Tales of the World: Radiant Mythology 2 in 2009, as well as for Sackgirl in puzzle platformer LittleBigPlanet 3 in 2016.

A multitude of figures have also been released of the character, including two 4 in (10 cm) immobile figurines of Taki in her primary outfit from Soulcalibur II as part of Yujin's gashapon figure collections 'Namco Girls' Series 1 and 4, and Wave released a 1/8 scale 7.5 in (19 cm) garage kit figure of Taki from the same game in 2003. In 2006, Namco released a MegaHouse PVC statuette based upon promotional artwork of Taki for the game as part of a Soulcalibur III, set along with an alternative-color unmasked version with three interchangeable weapons for it to hold. Triad Toys released a 12 in (30 cm) action figure of Taki from Soulcalibur IV in red and blue versions in 2008. In 2007–2010, Futene Karada and Aya released two resin kits for Taki's appearances in her prime costumes in Soulcalibur III, 7 in (17 cm) (crouching) and 9.4 in (24 cm) (dashing), as well as an alternate version of the latter. A 19.5 inch (50 cm) high statue of Taki based on her appearance in Soulcalibur II was announced by First 4 Figures in 2017, with a 23-inch (59 cm) variant released as a pre-order exclusive through the company's website.

== Critical reception ==
The emphasis of Taki's sexual attributes, particularly in regards to her breasts, has been a major discussion point regarding the character both positively and negatively.

Since her introduction, Taki has been positively received. Namco described Taki, Ivy and Nightmare as the three most popular Soulcalibur characters in North American markets in 2002, and in 2015 she was voted the series' second most popular character among the Western audience in an official Facebook poll by Namco Bandai. GMR magazine named her one of gaming's great heroines, noting they felt she was overdue for her own standalone game in light of other ninja-themed titles at the time.

John Warren of Fanbyte heavily praised her as a "simple, strong design Namco nailed right from the start," further adding that no other character in the series is as purely fun to play and calling her "pound-for-pound one of the best fighting game characters ever created." IGN's Jesse Schedeen stated "Everyone loves a good ninja, and Taki just so happens to be one of the best [...] it's hard to imagine a Soulcalibur game without Taki." The latter sentiment was echoed when she was excluded from Soulcalibur V, with sources such as Daniel Bischoff of GameRevolution calling the claim that Taki was too old to fit into the game a cop-out especially in light of Namco flaunting "Ivy and all of her overly abundant assets at the age of 50+."

Much of the reception around Taki focuses primarily on her appearance, namely her attire and breasts. Dave Halverson from Gamers' Republic wrote about being "elated" by its "work of art" character design of Taki, who "exhibits remarkable grace and agility, an almost spirit-like quality." Ben Richardson of GamesRadar+ commented: "Long time Soul Calibur battler Taki is a fanboy fave" due to how her suit made her breasts "resemble torpedoes [...] Namco really understands its fanbase", while Russian magazine Страна игр felt the form fitting nature of her attire coupled with her large bust actually made it more revealing, with editor-in-chief Mikhail Razumkin describing her as "the most beautiful woman in fighting games".

GameSpy in 2003 described her as "the bounciest ninja this side of Mai Shiranui" and later as "clearly modeled as though she is naked, but her clothes are just painted on to make it look like she's wearing a red bodysuit." According to Kotaku's Michael McWhertor, Taki's "outfit leav[es] absolutely nothing to the imagination, making her high kicks the stuff of Hustler magazine spreads." However, Cecilia D'Anastasio in an article for Kotaku argued that seeing Taki in Soulcalibur II's introduction, which she felt emphasized the character's sexual aspects, made the title seem "explicitly designed for straight boys my age" and made it harder for her to enjoy the series with friends as a woman.

Several publications have also noted the visible size of her breasts seemed to steadily increase as the games progressed, with Complex in particular stating "Taki, who has been there from the very beginning, went from a modest C cup to a, gee, we don't know, an F cup over the course of the series." PlayStation: The Official Magazine stated Taki "appears to have been reimagined with the gravity- defying Itagaki-san physics from Dead or Alive Xtreme 2 in mind." In a later article they added that she "seems to be, ahem, falling out of one of her two outfits during every battle", adding that it was distracting as a spectator. GamesRadar+ voiced their disproval of the change, implying her appearance in Soulcalibur IV was designed by a "a hormone-addled 13-year-old", further calling her breasts "simply unfathomable and totally impractical for the fighting physique." Bradly Flecher for play noted that while Taki was one of his favorite characters in the series, her "gargantuan, strangely comical bouncing breasts" made her resemble "a grotesque alien version of a real doll for mad-scientist plastic surgeons. Just plain weird, folks."

In scholarly examination of the character, University of Delaware professor Rachel Hutchinson stated that due to the tightness of her outfit Taki was the only character of the cast with visible nipples and pubis, making her arguably the most sexualized of all the female characters. However, she felt Taki's costume was particularly strong and powerful in contrast to those of the other female characters whose outfits were "softer and more fluid". She additionally suggested her prominent nipples and the later color shift of her outfit from blood red to shiny purple-pink may have been intended to feminize her design, both due her above-average height and in regards to perceptions of the Japanese ninja being a primarily male archetype. In another paper she further examined the subject, and expressed her belief that Taki's large breasts were "engineered to enhance the erotic element" of the games in contrast to Western media.

== See also ==
- Ninjas in popular culture
