= Nightmare (Soulcalibur) =

- Soulcalibur character
- Nightmare from Soulcalibur III
- First game: Soul Edge (1995)
- Voiced by: English: Ted D' Agostino (Soulcalibur II) Patrick Ryan (Soulcalibur III); Japanese: Nobuyuki Hiyama (Soulcalibur I-II, VI) Fumihiko Tachiki (Soulcalibur III) Kōsei Hirota (Soulcalibur Legends, IV) Yasunori Masutani (Soulcalibur V)

Nightmare (Japanese: ナイトメア, Hepburn: Naitomea) is a fictional character and the main antagonist of the Soulcalibur series of video games. The evil possessor of Siegfried Schtauffen (ジークフリート・シュタウフェン, Jīkufurīto Shutaufen)'s body, he later becomes an entity entirely separated from Siegfried in Soulcalibur III onward. Nightmare is the living incarnation of Soul Edge and a vessel for Inferno.

Nightmare first appeared in one of the possible endings and as an alternative skin for the Siegfried character in the game Soul Edge. In the sequel Soulcalibur, he was given a name and featured as a central character. Ever since then, Nightmare has been a major antagonist, with his ownership of Soul Edge making him the objective of many other characters in the story. Nightmare has served as a recurring antagonist in contrast to the protagonist role played by Siegfried, as well as serving as Siegfried's archenemy until Soulcalibur V, where Graf Dumas (actually Raphael Sorel) becomes the new host for Nightmare/Soul Edge/Inferno. In Soulcalibur VI, which serves as a reboot, Siegfried is once again Nightmare/Inferno's host once more.

Nightmare has appeared in all the sequels to Soulcalibur with visual differences between each game. His fighting style was altered from Soulcalibur II to Soulcalibur III after Siegfried became a separate character.

== Conception and design ==
During the development of Soulcalibur, Nightmare's helmet went through several iterations with an aim to give a sense of "pressure" and "emit an atmosphere that terrifies anyone who sees them." The finalized design was modeled after a unicorn, while his armor implemented imagery of a dragon, which the development team felt symbolized "evil, chaos and power". Early drafts of his design took inspiration from a chimera, with a lion's head on either his shoulder or chest, and one design featuring a snake in place of his right arm, and considered the idea of either head breathing fire or being able to bite opponents. They instead shifted took a more traditional look of a "black knight" with a large mutated arm gripping his sword. Said mutated left arm originally took inspiration from a fiddler crab, giving what the developers felt was a "heteromorphic" appearance to the character. While in the concept artwork Nightmare is depicted with his left arm mutated to hold the sword, in some early designs fused with the sword itself, in the final design his right arm is mutated instead, despite still wielding his sword with his left.

As for the weapon itself, while at one point they considered a coiled lance, most iterations kept the large zweihänder sword Siegfried had used in the original Soul Edge. Though there were concerns that early sketches of it being too big, the development team noted that by the final they made it even larger. Earlier drafts of it were given red pores and veins, meant to resemble a plant and to let one "feel the beauty even in the midst of fear" when looking at it, while elements such as a mouth and eye were added to give it a more organic appearance.

With Soulcalibur V, the character's appearance was changed dramatically, now designed with a bat motif in mind that designer Hirokai Kado suggested was significant, but did not clarify as to why.

== Appearances ==
Even though Nightmare originally debuted in Soulcalibur, its predecessor, Soul Edge, featured a prototype of his character. In the home version, an extra character named "Siegfried!" was added as an unlockable character. "Siegfried!" was an alternate version of normal Siegfried taken from his no-input ending, where he was consumed by the cursed sword Soul Edge. This early version was much different from the former Nightmare, having crimson armor and a more flesh-like design, almost as if he were part of Soul Edge itself. He has no story nor ending, and only used Siegfried's Soul Edge without effects. In the conclusion of Soul Edge, Siegfried battled with the corrupted pirate Cervantes de Leon and eventually came into possession of the Soul Edge with its lingering spirit, Inferno. Soul Edge tempted Siegfried to wield it with a promise to resurrect his dead father in exchange for gathering souls for its consumption. Not knowing that he is just being used, Siegfried agreed and started killing people to gather souls. Eventually, Soul Edge consumed him and Nightmare is born.

Allying himself with Astaroth, Ivy, and Lizardman in the city of Ostrheinsburg, Nightmare attempted to completely restore Soul Edge. However, the attempt failed when his castle was attacked by Kilik, Xianghua, and Maxi, causing his allies to abandon him. Nightmare was eventually defeated by Xianghua, which caused Siegfried to realize that he is the one who killed his father. This allowed him to temporarily break free from Soul Edge's control. He then hid the sword and himself out from civilization to atone his sins that he committed when he was consumed by Soul Edge.

By Soulcalibur II, Soul Edge was able to take over Siegfried's mind. At first it was for short periods of time during his sleep, but eventually it took Siegfried's body completely and used him to cause destruction once more. Raphael Sorel, a former French nobleman pursuing the blade for his own scheme, challenged Nightmare. He was defeated, but managed to pierce Soul Edge's eye with his rapier. This caused the sword to lose control over Siegfried, and allowed him to defeat Inferno and break free once again. Siegfried then discovered Soul Calibur, released from Inferno's body after its defeat, and impaled Soul Edge's eye with it. With both swords sealed, Siegfried abandoned his old armor and left with them.

In Soulcalibur III, Zasalamel revived "Nightmare" in essence. Created as an avatar for a disembodied Inferno using the original armor as a shell, he pursued and eventually recovered his true body, Soul Edge. Nightmare also met Tira, who became his servant and manipulated others into protecting Soul Edge and sacrificing souls for Nightmare, to eventually become sacrifices themselves. Meanwhile, Zasalamel manipulated Siegfried, leading him to Nightmare, and wielding Soul Calibur, he clashed against Soul Edge. At the moment the swords struck a burst of energy was released; Siegfried was mortally wounded, while Soul Edge and its body were pulled into a warped dimension, eventually returning to Ostrheinsburg.

In Soulcalibur IV, Soul Calibur revived Siegfried, while Inferno restored Soul Edge fully and strengthened his hold over the animated armor that was Nightmare. Inferno then claimed the entire city of Ostrheinsburg as a vessel due to the fact that Nightmare lacked the capacity to contain his consciousness, and as a result, the city became cursed and many of its inhabitants were corrupted. Tira continued serving Nightmare and manipulating Astaroth, Sophitia and others into serving Soul Edge, in order to weaken Soul Calibur and provide Nightmare with the strength necessary to destroy the spirit sword. Nightmare would then clash against Siegfried in a final duel, though his plans were interfered with the appearance of Algol and the Tower of Remembrance.

As revealed in Soulcalibur V, Soul Edge is shattered and Nightmare ceases to be during his final duel with Siegfried. However, the blade is brought back to life by pieces collected by its servants. Nightmare is reborn in the body of Raphael and assumes the alias of Graf Dumas. From there, Dumas works his way into the graces of the Holy Roman Emperor Rudolf II and is installed as the ruler of Hungary. Dumas exploits the war with the Ottomans to consume more souls and initiate a widespread search for the remaining fragments of Soul Edge. Unknown to him, his former servant Tira had been working to create a new Nightmare as she is not satisfied with Dumas.

Dumas manipulates one of his soldiers, Patroklos Alexander, into killing people corrupted by Soul Edge known as Malfested in exchange for help in his search to find his missing sister, Pyrrha. Patroklos revolts and flees from service. Dumas later discovers Patroklos and Pyrrha and reveals himself as Nightmare. He forces Pyrrha's hidden Soul Edge power to consume her, causing Patroklos to abandon her. Nightmare then initiated a war throughout Europe with his newfound power, but is eventually struck down and killed by Z.W.E.I., a young man whom he previously tried to hunt. Though Pyrrha Omega kills Z.W.E.I., Inferno makes her the new host for Soul Edge. She is defeated by Patroklos and both Soul Edge and Soul Calibur are sealed in the Astral Chaos.

Nightmare returned as a playable character in Soulcalibur VI. The game revisits the events of the original Soulcalibur and shows Nightmare possessing Siegfried once more.

=== Other appearances ===
Outside of the Soul series, Nightmare appeared in Seme COM Dungeon: Drururuaga where the player can obtain him as an "ally" and use his armor along with Soul Edge. Soul Edge also appeared as an enemy in Namco x Capcom where its shards became Charade and was fought as enemies, and made a cameo in Retro Game Challenge. A Sackboy costume of Nightmare was released as a DLC for LittleBigPlanet 3.

In 2000, Epoch C-Works released a series of action figures based upon the original Soulcalibur, amongst them Nightmare. The semi-posable figure came with equipable weapons from the title in the same package. In 2003, Todd McFarlane Productions released a Nightmare sculpture amongst a set of five based on characters from Soulcalibur II. The immobile figure was modeled after his primary outfit and stood six inches tall with a base.

Siegfried and Nightmare both appear in Soulcalibur manga and make a guest appearance as cards in a mobile video game Outcast Odyssey and in many cards in Universal Fighting System. They are also both featured on the official Soulcalibur VI arcade stick.

== Promotion and reception ==
In 2000, Epoch C-Works released a series of action figures based upon the original Soulcalibur, amongst them Nightmare. The semi-posable figure came with equipable weapons from the title in the same package. In August 2003, Todd McFarlane Productions released a Nightmare sculpture amongst a set of five based on characters from Soulcalibur II. The immobile figure was modeled after his primary outfit and stood six inches tall with a base. Nightmare's likeness was used as the basis for a costume for Sackboy in LittleBigPlanet 3, as part of a Soulcalibur themed costume pack for the title.

The staff of UGO.com praised him as the best character in the series, stating "Was there ever really any question? Not for us", and further praising his role as a playable "badass" villain. IGN listed him as a character they wished to see in Super Smash Bros. Brawl as a playable guest villain, though noted he was also "too extreme" for the series. In a later article on the Soul series itself, they noted "a Soul game simply feels incomplete without an appearance by the warring personalities of Siegfried and Nightmare", and praised the contrast between Siegfried's angelic figure and Nightmare's demonic form. In Game Informer's 2009 list of best fighting game characters, Nightmare placed second.

In a 2002 poll by Namco prior to the release of Soulcalibur II regarding their favorite character, Siegfried placed ninth with 2.5% of the tally, tied with Mitsurugi. In Bandai Namco's 2015 poll, Siegfried was voted the sixth most popular characters from the series, followed by Nightmare.

In a retrospective of how his design evolved between the along the course of the series, Cecilia D'Anastasio of Kotaku stated "When I was a little gaming baby playing SoulCalibur II, Nightmare’s demonesque appearance and weird sentient sword freaked me out." She added that while his armor design in Soulcalibur wasn't very interesting, "it didn't have to be: his torso sized claw and gory sword said what it needed to say." Describing his Soulcalibur II appearance as his "signature look", she praised the additions of his long red hair and extra organic detail added to Soul Edge, and stated the return to element of this look in Soulcalibur V as looking "very Dark Souls here". Lastly, she was critical of his appearance in Soulcalibur VI, saying the development team had "sacrificed grit for glitz in his design—he's way less scarier than he's ever been.
