= Ivy Valentine =

Fictional character from Soulcalibur

Isabella "Ivy" Valentine
- Soulcalibur character
- Ivy in Soulcalibur IV
- First game: Soulcalibur (1998)
- Created by: Hiroaki Yotoriyama
- Designed by: Koji Mitsunaga; Hideo Yoshie (SCIII onward); Mari Shimazaki (SCV outfits, Lost Swords)
- Voiced by: English: Renee Hewitt (Soulcalibur II); Lani Minella (Soulcalibur III - VI); Japanese: Yumi Tōma (Soulcalibur - Soulcalibur III, Queen's Gate: Spiral Chaos); Kanako Tōjō (Soulcalibur Legends, Soulcalibur IV, Soulcalibur: Broken Destiny); Miyuki Sawashiro (Soulcalibur V - VI)

In-universe information
- Weapon: Snake Sword (Valentine)
- Origin: London, Kingdom of England
- Nationality: English

Isabella Valentine (Japanese: イザベラ・バレンタイン, Hepburn: Izabera Barentain), commonly called Ivy (Japanese: アイヴィー, Hepburn: Aivī), is a character in the Soulcalibur series of video games. Created by Namco's Project Soul division, she first appeared in the original Soulcalibur and its subsequent sequels, later appearing in various merchandise related to the series. She was voiced in Japanese by Yumi Tōma between Soulcalibur and Soulcalibur III, Kanako Tōjō between Soulcalibur Legends and Soulcalibur: Broken Destiny, and Miyuki Sawashiro in Soulcalibur V, and Soulcalibur VI; in English, she was voiced by Renee Hewitt in Soulcalibur II and Lani Minella for the remainder of the series.

In the game, she is the illegitimate daughter of undead pirate Cervantes de Leon who was raised by a noble family until her father became obsessed with the cursed sword, Soul Edge, leading to his death and later her mother's. Desiring to destroy the sword, she creates a segmented, animated blade-whip, only to become Soul Edge's pawn and learn that it intends to use her as its next host. After an attack by Cervantes results in the loss of her soul, Ivy uses a temporary artificial one to keep herself alive, and continues after the blade.

Ivy is considered one of the most prominent characters in the series as well as one of its mainstays, having appeared in every installment since Soulcalibur. She is often referred to as the series' poster girl. Since her introduction, Ivy has been noted by critics for her sex appeal. Critical reception of her sexuality varies, with some saying the character's oversexualization is unnecessary, while others have argued that it is an essential aspect of her character design and has allowed for her to be more recognizable.

== Conception and creation ==
As a character introduced in Soulcalibur, Ivy's signature weapon, a "snake sword" designed to be unique amongst the other weapons in the game, was selected before other elements of the character. The weapon concept came from series producer Hiroaki Yotoriyama, who drew inspiration from the Galient Sword from the manga series Bastard!!. Afterwards, her design and concept were then built to revolve around it, starting with gender, then physical measurements, and lastly background details. The finalized design was chosen out of multiple concepts created by character designer Koji Mitsunaga. Her character was rendered as a 3D model by a design team that worked solely on her, and then animated mostly by Naotake Hirata using motion capture to create her in-game movements, with Yasushi Shibue designing the animations for her throws, and several animations created without the use of motion capture for positions difficult for the actors. During this phase the team additionally worked with the Soulcalibur story creators, refining the character's own role in the plot as needed throughout development.

While Ivy was one of the first characters they conceived for the new game, she was developed last amongst the roster. The sword itself initially caused an issue with the development process, as the lead programmer argued extensively with Yotoriyama that it couldn't be animated the way he wanted, resulting in lengthy discussions between the two. When developing her character model, the weapon would be graphically intensive, and as a result kept the total number of polygons required for her body low. To animate the sword, they developed a physical prototype, swinging it about in the development studio while wearing a kendo helmet to avoid hurting themselves. They took inspiration from a Chinese weapon called a nine-section whip, filming a weapon demonstration by an expert as a guide, and then used a mix of animation and motion capture to implement it into the game.

During development many alternatives for Ivy's design were considered, including a male ninja, a mummy, and a little girl, while the weapon remained constant, varying only in size. In the very early planning stages of Soulcalibur, Ivy was originally conceived as "ninja girl/woman", something that was attributed to certain developers who were fans of the "young girl moe aesthetic. After a few concepts of a male ninja, they instead switched towards a female "queen" design, feeling it would not overlap with their existing female characters and that Western audiences like such "freak" archetypes. As things progressed they wanted to emphasize her as sexy but also highly mobile with a mysterious air, feeling the bondage-themed attire helped convey this image. Several ideas also considered giving her an eyepatch or a mask covering the right side of her face, with her missing eye locked in a look of "revenge", however they decided to instead streamline her appearance and outfit for the sake of rendering her character in game.

With Soulcalibur II, the development team chose her as their favorite character from the previous title. Producer Hiroaki Yotoriyama felt that her fighting style was not perfectly expressed in Soulcalibur, and focused on Ivy from the start of the project to make her more "uniquely lethal". Namco has called Ivy one of the three most popular characters in the series in North American markets, alongside Taki and Nightmare. Soulcalibur V producer Hisaharu Tago emphasized this as a reason for the character's inclusion for the game, additionally citing her fighting style and role in the game's storyline. Senior visual designer Hideo Yoshi, who worked as the team' concept artist for Soulcalibur III onward, considered her his favorite in the series due to liking "cool female characters who could easily wear the main character mantle."

=== Design ===
Ivy's secondary designs contrast against her default appearance

A woman with short white hair cut into a bob cut, Ivy stands 179 centimetres (5 ft 10 1/2 in) tall, making her the series' tallest female character, while her bust size is 100 cm (39 in). A bluish-purple leotard covers her torso and arms, with patches of the fabric removed to expose her cleavage, buttocks and various parts of her abdomen. Similar leggings cover her legs midway below her thighs, connected to the leotard by garters at golden metal bands at their peak. A sleeve of the same material covers her right arm and hand, while armor covers her left arm, hand, and shoulder. A smaller pauldron covers her right shoulder, while high heels cover her feet, and a white glove covers her right hand. The left shoulder pauldron incorporates the Tudor Rose, a traditional heraldic symbol of England, while the plates of the armor were designed to resemble the links of her sword.

According to Soulcalibur VI producer Yoshinori Takahashi, Ivy's design was the result of her weapon requiring significant processing power in Soulcailbur, reducing the amount of free-flowing elements such as long hair or skirts that would increase the load. Ivy's outfit was designed with a motif of both thorns and two intertwining snakes in mind, and to have a high affinity with her weapon. While it has been altered slightly as the series has progressed, the concept has remained consistent throughout the series, with the exception of the removal of the glove in later designs.

For Soulcalibur V, they considered several ideas for a redesigned look, including a thorn-based design with heavy amounts of exposed skin and a heavily laced full bodysuit made of "armor that looks like clothing". They finally decided to combine concepts of a homunculus, nobility and a nurse/female doctor for her outfit. Despite the time gap between IV and V Ivy did not age due to her "cursed blood", though a collar and sleeves were added to her design to give her a more mature look, and at one point they considered glasses also but decided against them due to too many characters having facial accessories.

Ivy's alternate character designs in the games are a contrast to her primary designs, often reflecting her role in aristocracy but meant to still keep an air of "adult sex appeal". The secondary outfits from Soulcalibur to Soulcalibur III consist of countess attire of either blue or red pants, vest, and jacket, with white boots covering her feet and her hair combed back. In Soulcalibur II, a tertiary alternate design was added consisting of a red leotard and gloves with gold trimming, with red stockings on her legs; in addition, a fourth design resembling her appearance at the conclusion of Soulcalibur was considered, incorporating a cloak and the symbol of caduceus on the front of her leotard cupping her breasts, but was unused. In Soulcalibur III, a long, rose-themed dress with hat and veil was used as a tertiary alternate, one of several considered designs.

For Soulcalibur IV, a similarly themed black dress was used as her sole alternate design for the game. In Soulcalibur V a second outfit was created by guest contributor Mari Shimazaki, who had designed the character Bayonetta for Platinum Games. The outfit consists of a golden catsuit with a plunging neckline and white fur trimmings, as well as a serpent necklace with the head pointed towards her breasts with similar accessories on her ankles and wrists. Shimazaki added that while exposed skin was a trademark of Ivy's design, she wanted to take things in a fresh direction and focus on one bold point of exposure for the character's body, and felt only someone with Ivy's physique could pull the look off. Shimizaki later created an additional bunny-themed outfit for her appearance in Soulcalibur: Lost Swords, consisting of purple and lavender stripped frilled underwear, and a visored helmet with bunny ears sticking out of the top.

In an interview with Metro for Soulcalibur VI, producer Michinori Ozawa was asked about changes to Ivy's design as the series progressed, with the interviewer describing her current designs as "a lot more problematic today than they were when the series began". In response he stated "I understand that there are different opinions about such characters. So I think what's most important is how you want to express and design such characters, and not just the female characters. But I still want to keep the body shape and the atmosphere of each character to be the backbone of each character."

== Appearances ==
As introduced in Soulcalibur, Ivy was raised by the Valentines, a noble family in London, England. Ivy's father became obsessed with the cursed sword Soul Edge, and worked himself to death. Her mother died shortly afterward, and revealed to Ivy that she was not their biological daughter. Becoming an alchemist, Ivy learned of her father's obsession and decided to destroy Soul Edge. She created an animated, segmented sword, bringing it to life by unknowingly summoning Soul Edge's current host, Nightmare, and was convinced to become one of his allies without realizing he wielded the blade she sought. After learning the truth, and that her real father was the sword's previous host Cervantes and her to be its next, she departed. Continuing her quest to destroy the sword in later games, Ivy was attacked by Cervantes and her soul consumed in Soulcalibur IV. Using an artificial soul to keep herself alive, Ivy managed to defeat her father at Ostrheinsburg Castle at the end of the game. She also acts as a teacher to younger warriors when Soul Edge re-appears years later. In the rebooted timeline of Soulcalibur VI, she breaks into the vault of long-dead weapon merchant Vercii to steal his notes, angering its guarding Voldo, though appeases him by returning the notes once she has the information she needs.

Outside of the main series, Ivy appears in the prequel Soulcalibur Legends, allying herself with the protagonist Siegfried, and shares an understanding with another of his allies, Lloyd Irving. In Soulcalibur: Broken Destiny's "Gauntlet" storyline, a side story set after the events of Soulcalibur IV, Ivy assists the character Hilde and her party develop a cure for her father's ailment. When told that Cervantes' soul would be required as payment, they attempt to renegotiate, only for Ivy to use the protagonist's back as a chair while repeating her terms. She was also featured in a gamebook for the Queen's Gate series of ecchi books, and later appeared as a guest character in Queen's Gate: Spiral Chaos, utilizing her character design from Soulcalibur IV. Ivy appears in The King of Fighters All Star in both her Soulcalibur VI design, and her "Aristocrat Catsuit" costume from Soulcalibur V. In the story mode, Ivy is initially hostile, but later helps defeat Saiki from The King of Fighters XIII.

Ivy was also featured alongside Siegfried in a manga adaptation of Soulcalibur Legends printed in the Japanese shōnen Kerokero Ace; the manga, written in a humorous tone, used a running gag of Siegfried's annoyance that Ivy was significantly taller than him.

=== Gameplay and censorship ===
Designed as a weapon with the longest reach in Soulcalibur, Ivy's sword Valentine consists of several smaller blades linked together by a chain, able to take either broadsword or chain whip forms. These forms are represented by different stances Ivy can use in the series, altering many of her attacks for each and applying different uses to either form of the weapon, with some, such as Spiral Lust, a component of an existing attack. In addition to these, the sword can also have the segments be split apart, in which case they will attack the opponent in different ways before recombining on the sword's chain. Due to her variety, Ivy has been noted as being able to attack from any range, but also difficult to properly use unless utilizing a range the opponent is weakest at. Some of her attacks, such as Summoning Suffering and Calamity Symphony, involve grappling with the opponent to damage them, though these utilize complex controller inputs that require them to be utilized in tandem with other moves.

Some versions of the original Soulcalibur arcade game censored Ivy's default costume by covering her bare skin with a lavender catsuit. With Soulcalibur IV, Ivy's look on the promotional artwork was modified on the English website to hide her undercleavage, leading to suspicion of censorship in the American release of the game. When asked about the censoring, director Katsutoshi Sasaki stated he had heard of nothing of the sort having taken place. When released in North America it was shown that no actual censorship had occurred within the game.

== Promotion and merchandising ==
While advertisements have leaned heavily into Ivy's sexuality, those for Soulcalibur V received particular reaction and criticism

Several action figures and statues bearing Ivy's likeness have been produced by companies such as Kurushima, Kyosho, Epoch C-Works, Todd McFarlane Productions, and Prime 1 Studio. A twelve inch tall immobile PVC figurine modeled after her Soulcalibur III appearance was released by Enterbrain in September 2008, using a white version of her outfit and extended sword; a dark blue outfit for an "international color" version of the sculpture was also produced. Hobby Japan created a mail order exclusive 1/8 scale PVC figure of Ivy in 2011 in honor of her appearance in Queen's Gate: Spiral Chaos. In 2012, an Ivy bobblehead created by company Bobble Budds depicting her in her standard outfit was given to those who pre-ordered both the regular and Collector's Edition versions of Soulcalibur V.

Ivy was featured in a 1999 advertisement for the Dreamcast port of Soulcalibur, depicting a man at a drive-in theater kissing his girlfriend but stopping to focus on Ivy. The character has been used to demonstrate the graphical features of both Soulcalibur IV and its follow-up title, Broken Destiny in a tech demo and promotional flyer respectively, with an emphasis on demonstrating that while the model's polygon count was reduced, her figure was not. Her likeness was also used as the basis for a costume for Sackboy in LittleBigPlanet 3, as part of a Soulcalibur themed costume pack for the title. Two print advertisements for Soulcalibur V prominently featured close-up images of Ivy's cleavage and buttocks, respectively, and were featured in various mainstream Japanese newspapers including Nikkan Sports. The advertisements revolved around puns for either, such as "新春、期待に胸ふくらむ" (lit. "New year, my heart swells with anticipation").

The ads in particular received heavy criticism for their sexist content, and English variants of the advertisements were banned for display in the United Kingdom. Books such as Gender and the Superhero Narrative and Transnational Contexts of Culture, Gender, Class, and Colonialism in Play called them out as an extremely negative portrayals of both women and the character. When asked about the ads, Soulcalibur V producer Hisaharu Tago claimed the text was intended to be a double meaning in reference to the game's new "character creator" features, and further argued "having some sort of erotic aspect on the surface is part of Soul Calibur".

== Critical reception ==
Although commonly cited as one of the most difficult characters to play as in the Soul series, Ivy has received a great deal of positive reception and has been described as one of the series' best characters. In 2009, she was featured on the cover of French magazine Ig alongside other female video game characters as one of the top heroines of gaming. Tom's Games named her one of the fifty greatest female characters in video game history, stating that as "an anti-hero who frequently clashes with other Souls, Ivy is a fascinating character for a fighting game". UGO.com's staff noted her role as an antagonist in the first Soulcalibur while adding that it could be "difficult to truly appreciate [her] villainy" due to her attractiveness, and adding that her appearance and attitude made her "a feared competitor".

Ivy's appearance, body, outfit, and demeanor have all been at the center of discussions about the character, and have been attributed as reasons owing to her status as a fan favorite. She is commonly compared to or described as a dominatrix, and has been noted both as the series' sexiest female. She has been displayed in various third-party media, her likeness appearing in material including magazine swimsuit issue pin-ups and periodicals such as Play's annual Girls of Gaming series. Other sources have used her as a standard for a character archetype, comparing later created female characters to her design and appearance.

Her bodily proportions, specifically her bust and buttock size, have been criticized as increasingly over-the-top, unrealistic, and unnecessary as the series has progressed by publications such as Joystiq, Giant Bomb, VentureBeat, and Vice. Gavin Sheehan of Bleeding Cool remarked that her design lost clothing, and became bustier, with each new installment. At the 2011 PAX East convention, an all-female journal panel led by The Escapist's Susan Arendt agreed that while she was strong, and difficult but rewarding to master in the original Soulcalibur, as the series progressed Ivy was reduced to "a nice ass bouncing around the room" in later games. Cecilia D'Anastasio of Kotaku noted that while she was the most recognizable character of the series, she looked like "a caricature of a pubescent boy's preposterously-proportioned ideal video game lady" and that her character and weapon "helped land her in innumerable knock-off porn videos and pin-up images". She further felt that Ivy brought down Soulcalibur VI as a whole and made it feel out of place at E3 2018.

Other sources offered counterpoints. Zachary Miller of Nintendo World Report stated that while the character stuck in his memory due to her "generous proportions [...] it wasn't just the size, shape, or jiggle—it was the way Ivy seemed proud of them" due to her attire, and how she seemed to weaponize her body as a distraction against opponents. The Escapist's Adam LaMosca initially stated that while his first impression of the character was that she was the posterchild for "embarrassingly juvenile fighter design", he later came to see that her "oversexed dominatrix demeanor perfectly compliments her confident, punishing move set." Fernando D'Aquino of Brazilian website Techmundo stated she could be considered "a model of contemporary beauty", and felt her short white hair gave her a more "sensual look".

While former Fanbyte editor-in-chief John Warren described her as a poster girl for the series for "let's say predictable reasons", he praised the character's fighting style and weapon, adding he would argue "Ivy is the first character in the series with a developed personality". Going further, he stated that while hers was a "squarely Machiavellian jerk", it offered more than the characters that came prior. The staff of Polish website WP Gry meanwhile argued she both contradicted and enforced negative stereotypes of women, calling her "sexual to the point of repulsive". However, they acknowledged that while some considered her appearance excessive, others argued it was empowering and helped define her as a character.

The staff of Chinese magazine Gamer named her one of the most beautiful female characters in video games, praising how she gave off a mature, queen-like charm and was akin to a "rose with thorns". Going further, they enjoyed how she reveled in her own strength, having a signature laugh and further described her ultimate move as a masterpiece in 3D fighting games for both its presentation but also its difficulty in execution, which they felt heightened its psychological impact and overall conveyed both style and substance. Additional praise was given for her backstory, displaying her as having a sense of nobility and unpretentiousness, but also suggesting a hint of wickedness due to her relation to Cervants, something they saw reflected in the "slightly contemptuous at smile the corner of her mouth".

Discussing reactions to female character designs in gaming for Kotaku, Leigh Alexander noted that while Ivy's breast size seemed to increase in size as the series progressed, she felt it was part of the fantasy aspect of gaming. She further argued that Ivy's figure represents an ideal, calling characters like her "stand-ins for ourselves to some extent, we still haven't figured out a good reason why we want to look quite this way," and drew comparisons to depictions of the Roman goddess Venus. In a later article for GameSetWatch she further elaborated on this idea, stating that characters like Ivy still had a place in gaming with "It looks like Ivy's back is set to snap – but she's a game character; she'll be fine. Why not just enjoy it?"

=== Analysis ===
The book Race, Gender, Media described her as designed for the viewing enjoyment of players "often assumed to be heterosexual boys and men" due her "pneumatic" body and revealing clothing, and further argued it was part of a standard to display the strength, skill and autonomy of characters like her with a heavy focus on sexualized bodies. In a 2016 study done by researchers at Indiana University, Ivy was found to be the most sexualized character out of 571 playable female video game characters created between 1989 and 2014. The study used a character's "nudity, over-enlarged breasts or hips and unrealistically narrow waists" as "signs of hypersexualization".

University of Delaware professor Rachael Hutchinson discussed Ivy's design through several books and papers, describing her height, power and sexualization as serving to emphasize her as a "deviation" from the female norm, as well as reinforce gender roles in the fighting game genre. She however argued the character's physical divergence was somewhat warranted due to the emphasis on sexual deviance on her character, "that places her outside accepted norms of heterosexual characteristics." She attributed the "need" for such justifications heavily on societal expectations of gender. She referred to this again in a later study involving students examining fighting game characters and reactions to them, noting male players were quick to claim the character harmed their immersion in the game despite similarly under-dressed male characters, and were quick to label her "slutty" and a "sexual deviant" for it. Hutchinson further argued one may enjoy such characters for reasons beyond titillation, offering examples such as a player wanting to engage in sadomasochistic fantasy towards themselves or others in Ivy's instance.

Hutchinson also noted that while the developers focused on Ivy's exposed skin as one of her defining characteristics, she more questioned the "impossibility of her physique". More specifically her issue was with her design in Soulcalibur IV, noting that prior to that game Ivy's physique was "well built and realistic, a powerful full breasted woman with defined musculature and slim torso". However in IV Hutchinson stated Ivy appeared "deformed", with the developers drastically increasing her breast size and the emphasis of her corset upon her hips, while reducing her attire to bands barely covering her. She stated that the over-sexulization of her character undercut her physical strength, due to compensating for "muscular power with giant breasts", and balancing her masculine characteristics by exaggerating her feminine features. She explored this further in the book Japanese Culture Through Videogames, stating her belief that the introduction of Ivy's design led to a "sexualization race" amongst fighting game developers to see who could produce and get away with the most skin exposure in games, culminating in Dead or Alive Xtreme Beach Volleyball where the characters were ultimately barely clothed for the benefit of a supposedly heterosexual male audience.

In an article titled The Inexplicable Sexiness Of Ivy Valentine for Kotaku, Maddy Myers stated that while Ivy's secondary outfits were more fitting for her character due to her background, she'd grown defensive of her primary outfit, feeling it made no more or less sense than any other character's attire in the game. She added while "Ivy is the most obvious scapegoat when it comes to pointing out Soulcalibur's inexplicably sexy designs", similar reactions were not levied against other provocatively dressed female characters in the game, noting the presence of similarly dressed characters and adding that it was also "not about her storyline, since Ivy's backstory doesn't involve her getting disempowered or disrespected. It's her breasts. The implication is that the only way she could be respectable would be if they were covered up, or reduced in size—something closer to the cup size of [the] bikini-wearing tots". She further stated that despite feeling the series had never "humanized" Ivy and describing her as a "sex symbol designed predominantly by men", she felt characters like her could be "reclaimed" by female players as symbols of power.

The paper Subversive Ludic Performance: An Analysis of Gender and Sexuality Performance in Digital Games examined both viewpoints from Hutchinson and Myers, noting that the while the character was highly sexualized, the fact she was a dominatrix with an extremely sexual body in itself did not make her problematic as such people exist, but her presence in the environment of gaming did contribute to her acting as a stereotype. However it also argued that Myers' statement that non-heterosexual women enjoying the spectacle of a "sex-positive (female) dominant character, who is able to hold her own against powerful men" helped subvert the notion of such characters strictly serving as pander to the "male gaze", and that the focus on such pandering often disregarded non-heterosexual points of view, or simply the fact some players may enjoy a character they are particularly good with.
