= Soulcalibur =

Fighting video game series

- Genre: Fighting
- Developers: Project Soul; Bandai Namco Studios; Dimps
- Publisher: Bandai Namco Entertainment
- Creator: Hiroaki Yotoriyama
- Platforms: Arcade; PlayStation; Dreamcast; PlayStation 2; GameCube; Xbox; Wii; PlayStation 3; Xbox 360; PlayStation Portable; Mobile phones; Android; iOS; Windows; PlayStation 4; Xbox One; Nintendo Switch 2
- First release: Soul Edge; February 20, 1996
- Latest release: Soulcalibur VI; October 19, 2018

Soulcalibur (ソウルキャリバー, Sōrukyaribā) is a fighting game franchise developed by Bandai Namco Studios and published by Bandai Namco Entertainment.

There are a total of seven main installments and various media spin-offs, including music albums and a series of manga books in the Soulcalibur series. The first game in the series, Soul Edge (or Soul Blade outside Japan), was released as an arcade game in 1996 and was later ported to consoles; the widespread success of its second main installment Soulcalibur in 1998 led to Soulcalibur becoming the name of the franchise, with all subsequent installments also using the name onwards. More recent games in the series have been released for consoles only and have evolved to include online playing modes.

The central motif of the series, set in a historical fantasy version of the late 16th and early 17th centuries, are mythical swords, the evil weapon called "Soul Edge" and the subsequent sword used to oppose this evil, "Soul Calibur" (parsed as two words, while the series' title is written as a single word). While it has developed during its various iterations, some of the characters and gameplay elements have remained consistent throughout the series.

Project Soul was the internal Namco development group responsible for the Soulcalibur franchise after the release of Soulcalibur II. Although the games are usually credited to Namco itself, the team established its name to draw attention to the group's combined accomplishments. The group was dissolved following the completion of Soulcalibur V. Development for the series has been dormant after support for Soulcalibur VI ended and its producer, Motohiro Okubo, departed Bandai Namco.

== Games ==
Release timeline
1996	Soul Edge
1997
1998	Soulcalibur
1999–2001
2002	Soulcalibur II
2003–2004
2005	Soulcalibur III
2006
2007	Soulcalibur Legends
2008	Soulcalibur IV
2009	Soulcalibur: Broken Destiny
2010–2011
2012	Soulcalibur Mobile
2012	Soulcalibur V
2013	Soulcalibur II HD Online
2014	Soulcalibur: Lost Swords
2014	Soulcalibur: Unbreakable Soul
2015–2017
2018	Soulcalibur VI

All games in the series before Soulcalibur III were originally released as arcade games, and subsequently ported to home consoles. The ported versions are known for their extra features, including characters, weapons, costumes, art galleries, martial arts demonstrations and involved single-player modes, when compared to the original arcade versions. For example, Seung Han Myong (Romanized in later games as Seong Han-myeong) is not featured in the arcade version of Soul Edge and in home versions there is a role-playing-type mode titled "Edge Master" where the player can unlock various items including weapons for the default characters.

=== Main series ===
==== Soul Edge ====
The first installment, titled Soul Edge, was released for arcades in 1996, and was later updated to Soul Edge Ver. II. This enhanced version was then ported to the PlayStation, where it was renamed Soul Blade outside Japan. Set in the late sixteenth century, the game follows nine warriors in a quest, each of whom has their own reasons for joining the quest but they all share a common goal: to obtain the legendary sword, called 'Soul Edge'. After appearing in arcades, the game was made available for PlayStation the same year. Along with its soundtrack, it has been praised for being innovative yet traditional to the fighting genre of games.

==== Soulcalibur ====
The sequel to Soul Edge was released for arcade a year later, with a port for the Dreamcast in 1999. The plot is set 2-3 years after the first game. The title is derived from Soul Calibur, a legendary weapon which opposes the evil of Soul Edge. Though retaining elements of its predecessor, Soulcalibur incorporates an extensive number of new features, including the "8-Way Run". The title Soulcalibur became a trademark title to be used throughout the series since. In 2008, Namco Bandai released Soulcalibur on the Xbox Live Arcade for the Xbox 360. Although online leaderboards and achievements were supported in this version, there was no online playing mode or mission mode, as there was in the Dreamcast version.

==== Soulcalibur II ====
2002's Soulcalibur II further improves and expands on the Soulcalibur original, in both graphics and gameplay. Soulcalibur II was released in arcade format three years after the previous release in the series, and was subsequently ported to all three active sixth-generation consoles. This is the first game in the Soulcalibur series to feature characters from non-Namco media, such as Link from Nintendo's The Legend of Zelda, playable on the GameCube. Featured on the PlayStation 2 version's roster is Heihachi Mishima of Tekken, while Image Comics' character Spawn was an addition for the Xbox version.

A high definition-optimized enhanced port of the game, entitled Soulcalibur II HD Online, was released in November 2013, and features revamped HD visuals, online play, and trophy/achievement support. It is a digital release and is available through Microsoft's Xbox Live Arcade and Sony's PlayStation Network digital storefronts. Being based on the original PlayStation 2 and Xbox releases, both ports include the two guest characters (Heihachi Mishima and Spawn) who were originally exclusive to each platform.

==== Soulcalibur III ====
Breaking with tradition, the PlayStation 2 version of Soulcalibur III came out in 2005 before an Arcade Edition was released in 2006. It uses a different graphics engine. Soulcalibur III contains a new single-player mode called "Tales of Souls", a story mode in which the player can make course-altering decisions. Arenas are more interactive, for example with rocks breaking if a character were to impact against them. Soulcalibur III is the first game in the series to feature a character creation system, and features a story mode called "Chronicles of the Sword" which is a mode with some strategic aspects for created characters.

The game received a new release for the PlayStation 4 and PlayStation 5 in December 2025, available only through Sony's PlayStation Network digital store.

==== Soulcalibur IV ====
Released in 2008 for the PlayStation 3 and Xbox 360, the fourth installment of the series is the second game with no arcade release prior to the release of the home game, as well as being the first to take bouts online and the last game to be set in 1590. Soulcalibur IV introduces new gameplay mechanics into the series in the form of damage-absorbing armor (that can be shattered) and Critical Finishes (both tied to the new Soul Gauge). Like Soulcalibur II, the fourth game also includes cameos from different media. The Star Wars character Darth Vader is a playable character on the PlayStation 3 version, while Yoda is for the Xbox 360 version. Each character was also available for download on the consoles in which they do not appear. Both versions of the game include the Apprentice character from Star Wars: The Force Unleashed. Like Soulcalibur III, the game includes a character creation system with various customizable parts, some of which have to be unlocked. These characters can be taken into online bouts, which in itself is a new addition to the series. However, unlike Soulcalibur III, the only available weapon disciplines are taken from the existing roster and there are no unique disciplines for created characters.

==== Soulcalibur V ====
Released in 2012 for the PlayStation 3 and Xbox 360, Soulcalibur V is the sixth installment of the series and the second game to take bouts online. With the story taking place 17 years after the events of Soulcalibur IV, many of the characters appearing in previous games were replaced or absent. It also features guest character Ezio Auditore da Firenze from the Assassin's Creed series as well as the fighting style of Devil Jin from the Tekken series. The game introduced a new power gauge, which fills throughout the match and allows players to trigger special attacks called Critical Edge or Brave Edge, similar to other fighting game series.

==== Soulcalibur VI ====
Soulcalibur VI was released in 2018 for the PlayStation 4, Xbox One and PC. Although it is the seventh installment of the series, it acts as a reboot, taking the series back to a reimagined timeline after Soul Edge. It introduced a new cinematic defensive technique in Reversal Edge, as well as a "Lethal Hit" system which allows select moves to deal additional damage when specific conditions are met, increasing variety between the playable characters. Brave Edge mechanics introduced in Soulcalibur V were largely removed in favour of a reimagined Soul Charge, which allows fighters to access more powerful moves for a brief amount of time after its activation. Guest characters include Geralt of Rivia from The Witcher series as well as 2B from Nier: Automata. The game was the final one in the series.

=== Spin-offs ===
==== Soulcalibur Legends ====
Released in 2007 for the Wii, Soulcalibur Legends is the series' first spin-off title. Departing from the usual fighting game genre, it is an action-adventure game with elements of hack and slash, in which the player controls one out of the game's seven playable characters through a level infested with enemies and defeats the boss in the end. It features competitive and cooperative gameplay in addition to the single-player mode. Soulcalibur Legends, although set between the events of Soul Edge and Soulcalibur, is non-canon to the series.

==== Soulcalibur: Broken Destiny ====
Released in 2009 for the Sony PSP, Soulcalibur: Broken Destiny is the first portable installment of the Soulcalibur series. It uses many of the features used in Soulcalibur IV, such as the soul crush, armor destruction, critical finishers, and Character Creation, and also brings in some new features such as new lighting effects for stages that correspond to different times of day, and the new Gauntlet Story mode. The game's features are similar to Soulcalibur IV, including its customization features, but it introduced a new character named Dampierre, a conman who wears twin blades on his wrists. In addition, Kratos from the God of War franchise appears as a guest character. Broken Destiny received very positive reviews.

==== Soulcalibur: Lost Swords ====
Released in 2014, Soulcalibur: Lost Swords is a free-to-play video game distributed through the PlayStation Network. It is a strictly single-player game based on Soulcalibur V in which the goal is for the player to collect loot, including raw materials and weapons, through battles in the new Quest Mode.

==== Soulcalibur Pachislot ====
Soulcalibur Pachislot (パチスロ ソウルキャリバー, Pachisuro Sōrukyaribā) is a spin-off game in the Soul series as a pachislot machine created to celebrate what was the 20th Anniversary of the Soul series. It was developed by Project Soul and published by Yamasa for arcades and Apple iPhone, iPad, and iPod devices which was developed by Ichikaku Co,. Ltd. in Japan on January 29, 2017. The game's story is based on, and uses assets such as music, graphics, and models from Soulcalibur V along with the some of its more notable characters across various in-game modes. The story is given to players in the form of cutscenes that flow normally or are arranged on the fly based on the player's progress. Soul Dimension is the main mode, and it features Patroklos and Pyrrha battling monsters in Astral Chaos, Deadline Battle mode features Patroklos fighting Cervantes, Astaroth, Voldo, or Tira in a more classic environment mimicking the fighting games in a theatrical style, Justice Overdrive mode features other characters from Soulcalibur V, Nightmare Battle mode features Patroklos protecting Pyrrha from Nightmare, Omega Mode features Pyrrha becoming malfested in order to protect Patroklos from Nightmare and his army, Just Judgement mode that features Inferno, and Algol Bonus mode features Algol giving players bonus points.

==== Soulcalibur Mobile ====
Soulcalibur Mobile is a fighting game designed for Java-based cellphones, heavily based on Soulcalibur IV, and released in 2012 by Namco Bandai. The gameplay mechanics are primarily borrowed from Soulcalibur IV but movesets are watered down for mobile devices. The main difference is that Soulcalibur Mobile is a 2D Fighter but still retains 8 directional movement. Much of the story is the same as Soulcalibur IV.It is not distributed in Japan.

==== Soulcalibur: Unbreakable Soul ====
Initially trademarked by Bandai Namco in October 2013, Soulcalibur: Unbreakable Soul was announced on Bandai Namco's Global Gamer's Day 2014 for iOS, the third Soulcalibur game to be released on a mobile platform, after an iOS and Android port of Soulcalibur and the Java-based cellphone game Soulcalibur Mobile. Released on May 8, 2014, Unbreakable Soul is a card-based fighting game where players can pick different attack cards to strike enemies. The elemental system makes a return from Soulcalibur: Lost Swords; players can mix cards with one of five elements: fire, water, wind, light, and dark. There are over 200 weapons as well as more than 150 player avatars featured. The game's story revolves around Cassandra and Edge Master in their efforts to find the fragments of Soul Edge. Unbreakable Soul received unfavorable reviews.

== Gameplay ==
Soulcalibur is a 3D fighting game series, sharing concepts and features with games like Virtua Fighter or Tekken. Both players must pick a character before fighting a duel divided in several rounds. Each character has their own preferred fighting style and weapon. To win a round, players must deplete their opponents' health gauge or propel them out of the arena.

The games use a four button layout for control. 'G' is used to Guard, allowing fighters to block incoming attacks. 'A', 'B' and 'K' allow players to perform horizontal weapon attacks, vertical weapon attacks and kick attacks respectively. These buttons are then combined with directions from a d-pad or a joystick to perform one of several dozen moves available to each character.

Soulcalibur introduced the series' trademark 8-Way Run system. It allows players to easily move their characters around the arena, taking full advantage of the game's 3D environments. Using this technique, players can maneuver around attacks or away from ring edges. Several attacks are only available from an 8-Way Run state. Soulcalibur also introduced an air control system that allows players to move their characters after they are hit in midair, letting them dodge most aerial juggles. This feature has meant that the Soulcalibur series features shorter combos than many competing fighting games.

Introduced in Soul Edge, Guard Impacts are a defensive technique that allows the player to check an incoming strike and create an opening even against otherwise safe moves. These parries require precise timing and expose the fighter performing them to retaliation if used incorrectly. After a successful parry, the opposing player cannot perform any action besides a Guard Impact of their own. Soulcalibur through to Soulcalibur IV required different inputs to counter different moves ; by contrast, Soulcalibur V and Soulcalibur VI allow players to spend resources to counter any incoming attack regardless of attack height, so long as they can predict its timing.

Soul Edge featured a mechanic intended to limit blocking in the Weapon Meter. As a player blocked attacks, their Weapon Meter would deplete. Once empty, their character could be disarmed, preventing them blocking any further attacks and forcing them to fight bare-handed until the end of the round. This system was abandoned in Soulcalibur, before being brought back in the form of the Soul Gauge in Soulcalibur IV. There, breaking the opponent's guard allows a player to perform a Critical Finish and win the round immediately. This was amended in Soulcalibur V to only provide an opening for a damaging combo.

== Plot ==
=== Presentation ===
Soul Blade and Soulcalibur through Soulcalibur IV provide their story through their "Arcade", "Tale of Souls" or "Story" mode, in which the player picks a character then follows a series of fights culminating in a duel against the wielder of Soul Edge or Soul Calibur. The story is presented through cinematic cutscenes, digital artworks as well as expository text, punctuating the end and sometimes the start of arcade mode. Character episodes are frequently contradictory, depicting the chosen characters destroying Soul Edge or seizing it for their own purposes. These contradictions would only be settled by the next game in the series, where the game manual, promotional material and in-game character biographies explain the events leading up to this point.

The games also feature another single-player mode with its own story, alternatively called "Edge Master Mode", "Weapon Master Mode", "Chronicles of the Sword" and more. These stories present their own setting different from that of the Arcade mode, and were largely dismissed when establishing continuity between the different games.

=== Soul Edge to Soulcalibur IV ===
In Soul Blade, Soul Edge is in the possession of Cervantes de Leon, who has stolen it a couple of decades earlier at the behest of the Italian arms merchant Vercci. Rather than bringing it to his employer, he turned to piracy, plundering ships traversing the Atlantic and slaughtering their crew. At the site of one his massacres in Spain, he is met with two warriors intent on stopping him: Sophitia, a Greek swordswoman, and Taki, a Japanese demon hunter. Using the power bestowed upon her by Hephaestus, Sophitia is able to triumph over Cervantes and damage Soul Edge, but her wounds prevent her from destroying the cursed weapon completely.

Instead, a German bandit called Siegfried Schtauffen happens upon the corpse of Cervantes and takes possession of the remaining blade of Soul Edge. Preying upon his insecurities, the weapon takes control of him, promising him revenge for the murder of his father and even to resurrect him. Siegfried goes on to become the Azure Knight, "Nightmare", and sows terror throughout Europe with his army of monsters.

Soulcalibur expands on the events after Cervantes' defeat, focusing on the release of the "Evil Seed", a catastrophic event that drives people across the world mad with bloodlust and transforms others into grotesque creatures. Kilik, a student of martial arts at Ling Sheng Su temple in Tibet, is one of its victims: After killing his fellow students in a fit of madness, he leaves for Europe to find the source of this evil. Joined by his companion Chai Xianghua, he infiltrates Nightmare's base of operations at Ostrheinburg Castle to confront the Azure Knight. During the fight, Xianghua's ancestral blade reveals itself to be the titular Soul Calibur, a lost treasure of Ling Sheng Su with the power to banish evil. Their victory allows Siegfried to break free of Soul Edge's influence for a time, and to realise the truth about his father's death: His father's killer was none other than himself.

However in Soulcalibur II, Siegfried finds himself under Soul Edge's spell once more. A battle against another seeker of Soul Edge, the disgraced french nobleman Raphael Sorel, allows him to slip out of the sword's control and impale it with Soul Calibur. This is the opening scene of Soulcalibur III, where the two swords are locked together in the "Soul Embrace". This fourth game revolves around the machinations of the sorcerer Zasalamel, who seeks to use the swords' magic to bring an end to his immortality. Having found the armour of the defeated Azure Knight, he reanimates it into a new Nightmare. This creation is drawn to the missing fragments of the cursed sword, and Zasalamel is able to follow it to the location of the two blades. However, once there, the ritual to end his immortality goes awry, overwhelming him and once again separating Soul Edge from Soul Calibur.

In Soulcalibur IV, the separation of the Soul Embrace has liberated several souls held within the weapons. Among them is Algol, an ancient warrior king who had wielded Soul Edge and from its cursed steel forged Soul Calibur. Algol raises the Tower of Remembrance, and calls upon the wielders of the two swords to join him. In this final confrontation, the disembodied Nightmare is able to count on the assistance of his former enemy Sophitia Alexandra, whose child has been taken hostage by his follower Tira. Siegfried bears Soul Calibur, whose nature had been changed by the Soul Embrace and become more assertive.

=== Soulcalibur V ===
Unlike earlier games, Soulcalibur V features a single linear story mode. Its events take place 17 years after Soulcalibur IV, and revolve around the two children of Sophitia Alexandra: Patroklos is a young, arrogant swordsman searching for his sister Pyrrha, who was kidnapped by Tira at the end of Soulcalibur III. Unbeknownst to him, Tira has been grooming his sister to become the new vessel of Soul Edge.

=== Soulcalibur VI ===
Soulcalibur VI's "Soul Chronicle" returns to the events of the original Soulcalibur, depicting Kilik, Xianghua and Maxi's travels to Europe to take on Nightmare. It also features episodes for each individual character, which unlike in previous games do not necessarily interact with Soul Edge or the other playable characters. These episodes portray events taking place during Soulcalibur and shortly before Soulcalibur II.

It also features a second story mode titled "Libra of Soul", which takes place concurrently with the main narrative. In this mode, the player creates a custom character who serves as the protagonist. They then embark on a journey to prevent a new character called Azwel from recreating the Evil Seed, while grappling with their own nature as a being cursed by Soul Edge.

== Characters ==
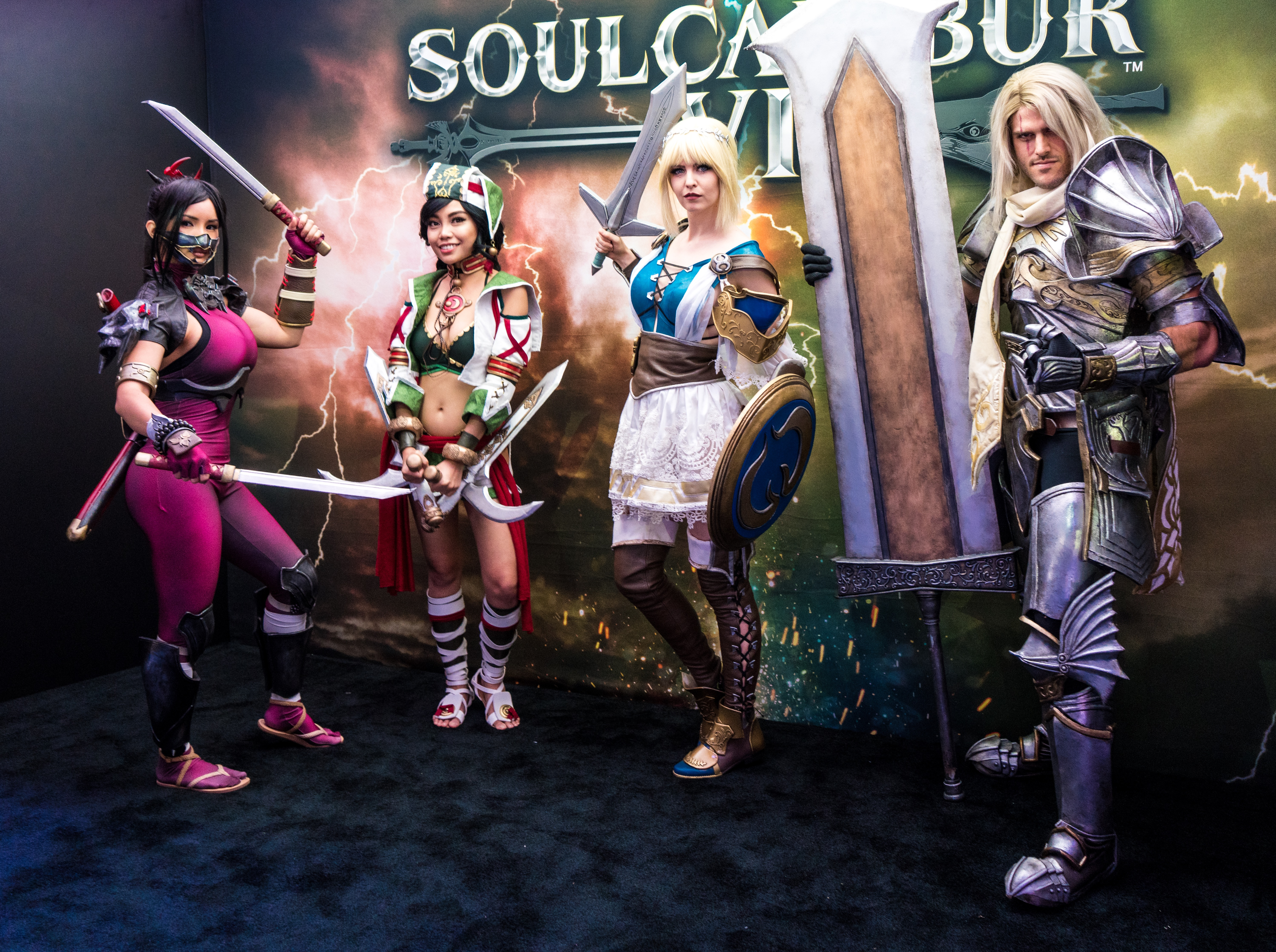
Models dressed as Taki, Talim, Sophitia and Siegfried from Soulcalibur VI at PAX West 2018

The Soulcalibur series features a wide variety of characters hailing from various countries, backgrounds, and disciplines. Most characters typically have their own reasons in partaking their journey, although they frequently meet and interact with each other and most also share a common goal; finding either the cursed sword Soul Edge or its holy counterpart, Soul Calibur. As the game is set in the late 16th century, many real-life events happening during the timeline often influence the story, one example being Oda Nobunaga as the initiator for Yoshimitsu's journey to find Soul Edge.

Out of all the characters in the series, four characters have appeared in all nine games so far: Cervantes, Mitsurugi, Siegfried and Nightmare, the latter two making one appearance each as an alternate costume to each other. Four characters: Astaroth, Ivy, Sophitia, and Taki have come close, appearing in eight games. Other characters who do not appear often make cameos or are commented upon in-game. While continuously being revised in each game, the character lineup generally stay consistent until Soulcalibur V, in which a major time skip is done and the character roster undergoing major changes, with former mainstays being replaced by their younger successors.

The series is notable for its inclusion of characters from other series appearing as guests. Since Soulcalibur II, every sequent game have hosted guest characters, usually from other Namco franchises, although more recent games have branched into titles developed by other companies, such as The Legend of Zelda, Spawn, Star Wars, God of War, Assassin's Creed and The Witcher. The guests, though, can only appear in one game due to licensing. Guest characters who have appeared in the series include Heihachi Mishima, Devil Jin, King, Ling Xiaoyu, Asuka Kazama, and Jun Kazama from Tekken (the latter five as attires for custom characters), Link from The Legend of Zelda, Spawn from Spawn, Lloyd Irving from Tales of Symphonia, KOS-MOS from Xenosaga (as an attire for custom characters), Darth Vader, Yoda, and The Apprentice from Star Wars, Kratos from God of War, Ezio Auditore da Firenze from Assassin's Creed, Geralt of Rivia from The Witcher, 2B from NieR: Automata and Haohmaru from Samurai Shodown. Other than featuring characters from other series, the series' characters have also appeared in other video games as well, including the Ridge Racer series, Pac-Man Fever, Smash Court Tennis Pro Tournament 2, Queen's Gate: Spiral Chaos, Musou Orochi 2 Ultimate, as well as crossover titles such as Namco × Capcom and Project X Zone 2.

== Other media ==
=== Books ===
A five-volume manhua based on Soulcalibur (劍魂 Jiànhún lit. translation 'Soul of Sword') was published in 1999 by author Mó yì (魔翼) and was published by Qingwen (青文). A separate two volume manhua titled Soulcalibur: Spirit Sword (靈神劍, Ling Shenjian, lit. translation: Spirit Holy Sword) was released in 1998 that retold the events of the first game but with Hwang as the central character in a setting with Sci-Fi elements. A two-volume novelization was written by Tobita Mandom (supervised by Project Soul), illustrated by JUNNY, and published by Shueisha in Japan in 2012. Several guide and art books were published in Japan for various installments of the series by Namco, Enterbrain, Gamest, Nintendo and V Jump.

=== Soundtracks ===
Two soundtrack albums were released for Soul Edge, and one album for each of Soulcalibur, Soulcalibur II, Soulcalibur III, Soulcalibur IV, Soulcalibur V and Soulcalibur VI.

=== Traditional games ===
Soulcalibur series characters were featured in the 2006 collectible card game Universal Fighting System. Taki and Ivy were also the subject of a 2011 erotic gamebook in the Queen's Gate series. Pyrrah was later included.

=== Film adaptation project ===
During spring 2001, the martial arts film star Sammo Hung announced plans for a film adaptation of Soulcalibur. The film was to be directed by Hung and would be produced by Alan Noel Vega, Michael Cerenzie, Sam Kute and Joseph Jones. According to a statement posted on his website, the film budget would need to be $50 million, locations were to include Eastern Europe and China, and the special effects would be done by Rhythm and Hues Studios because of their relationship with Namco. In 2004, Warren Zide's Anthem Pictures acquired the rights to adapt the game to film, which would be produced by Matthew Rhodes and Noel Vega and released in 2007. It has been stated that the film's plot "revolves around two warriors who are chosen by Shaolin monks to recover and destroy a powerful sword that has fallen into the hands of an evil prince who plans to use it to open the gates of hell and destroy the world." The now-defunct teaser website for the film (soulcaliburthemovie.com) contained a citation from Nostradamus. The film remains in development hell.

== Reception ==
The Soulcalibur series is a successful fighting game franchise. As of 2012, the Soulcalibur series had sold more than 13 million units worldwide, with that number, as of 2018, rising to more than 15 million. As of July 2021 the series has crossed over 17 million units worldwide. The series has been rated favorably for the majority of its main series titles.
