= Sophitia Alexandra =

Character in the Soulcalibur video game series

- Soulcalibur character
- Sophitia in Soulcalibur II
- First game: Soul Edge (1995)
- Designed by: Koji Mitsunaga
- Voiced by: English: Diane Holmby (Soulcalibur II) Erica Lindbeck (Soulcalibur VI); Japanese: Michiko Neya (Soul Edge–Soulcalibur III); Chie Nakamura (since Legends)

In-universe information
- Weapon: Xiphos and shield
- Origin: Athens, Greece
- Nationality: Greek

Sophitia Alexandra (Japanese: ソフィーティア・アレクサンドル, Hepburn: Sofītia Arekusandoru) is a character in the Soulcalibur series of video games. Created by Namco's Project Soul division by designers Aya Takemura and Takuji Kawano, she first appeared in Soul Edge and its subsequent sequels, later appearing in various merchandise related to the series. A baker turned warrior from Athens fighting with a Xiphos and shield, Sophitia became involved in the search for the cursed sword Soul Edge at the behest of the god Hephaestus. The affair soon affected her other family members as well, including her sister, Cassandra, and later her children, Pyrrha and Patroklos.

Originally voiced by Michiko Neya, Sophitia's designs focused heavily on her beauty typically with outfits reflecting Greek themes, however the emphasis on making her beautiful led to the development team trying to find a balance between a "sacred" and "vulgar" appearance for her character. In later entries in the series she has been one of the first characters to be implemented into the game, and served as a benchmark for other later characters to test against as they were implemented. While her gameplay has evoked mixed reactions, the character herself has received positive reception. While her beauty was often praised by the media, she has also commonly been cited in scholarly literature as an example of oversexualization in video game women.

== Conception and design ==
As a character introduced in Soul Edge, Sophitia's weaponry, a Xiphos (greek shortsword) and shield combination designed to be unique amongst the other weapons in the game, were selected before other elements of the character. Her design and concept were then built to revolve around it, starting with gender, then physical measurements, and lastly background details. As with all the characters, after her appearance and movement were fleshed out by a concept artist, her character was rendered as a 3D model by a design team that worked solely on her, and then animated by Tomoe Yamashita using motion capture to create her in-game movements. Yamashita, who additionally created the "struck" movements for many other characters in the game, noted particular fondness for Sophitia while designing her.

During her creation, designers focused on maintaining an innocent appearance for her face, to give the character a sense of feeling fresh and young. Freedom of movement between the sword and shield were emphasized, with the intention to allow for the blade to rotate around the shield for cyclonic attacks. The character concept would later be revisited in Soulcalibur IV, appearing as an ally character in Sophitia's story mode and using her fighting style. While developing Soulcalibur VI, Sophitia and Mitsurugi have been the first characters to be created and then used "as a foundation" for the decisions regarding the other characters' based on how well they would fit alongside the pair, and further described her gameplay as representative of Soulcalibur as a whole. Sophitia stands at 168 centimetres (5 ft 6 in) tall, and has a bust size of 90 cm (35 in).

Designed with a Greek holy warrior motif in mind, Sophitia is a blonde woman dressed in a white and brown frock, with boots extending up her thighs and armor plating on her shoulders and chest. As the series progressed, more of her skin became exposed and armor removed, with her outfit taking on a primarily blue appearance starting in Soulcalibur and then completely white by Soulcalibur III. When asked in an interview if changes to her character design focused primarily on sex appeal for the benefit of a male audience, former series producer Motohiro Okubo responded "We weren’t necessarily going out to try and intentionally make something sexy for the purpose of being sexy." However in the artbook Legend of Soulcalibur, the design team noted the changes to her outfit in Soulcalibur to expose more of her breasts was done "for male fans", with an additional note expressing disdain for the change. In the same book, another design proposal for the game was noted to draw attention to the area of "her belt to the thick peach", the latter being a euphemism for a woman's behind. Developer notes instructed the team to find a balance between "sacred" and "vulgar" in response to their proposals.

Sophitia has also had a variety of alternative outfits. One considered for Soul Edge was an outfit was designed to have black hair and an asymmetrical appearance meant to give the impression it went through multiple battles. Dubbed "Azola", this outfit went unused as the development team felt it fit more a goddess of war aesthetic than the neat and clean appearance they planned for Sophitia. Meanwhile, for the PlayStation version of station, an outfit consisting of a plaid skirt, blue jacket with cleavage, red scarf, and a jeweled ornate pill box hat was added. Unlike her other designs, this was not done by the development team but was instead a contest submission for a Japanese PlayStation-themed magazine, and according to the fan book was intended to display an "India" cultural theme. Alternative designs for Sophitia were also added as full unlockable variants in Soul Edge: "Sophitia!", which featured a more revealing constume, and "Sophitia!!", who fought in a one-piece swimsuit. Both were otherwise identical to the original character, with a developer comment in the official fan book for Soul Edge stating they "may not be able to do this again" in regards to the swimsuit.

== Appearances and gameplay ==
Sophitia was introduced in the 1996 video game Soul Edge as a simple baker from Athens, Greece ordered by the Greek god Hephaestus to destroy a parasitic living sword, Soul Edge, which had manifested as a pair of twin blades. Though she destroyed one of them, shards from its destruction wounded her, leaving one piece embedded near her heart. After recovering, she led a quiet life until years later she was tasked once more to destroy a restored Soul Edge and its new host, Nightmare. Unable to locate it before its destruction, she returned home to her husband and gave birth to a daughter, Pyrrha, and later a son, Patroklos. Years later the blade attempted to reform again and Sophitia set again, followed closely by her sister Cassandra. She encountered the warrior Tira who threatened her children, and due to Tira's machinations, Pyrrha is left in a state where she would not survive if the sword were destroyed, leaving Sophitia forced to protect it for the sake of her daughter. When the blade was ultimately destroyed again, Sophitia used the fragment near her heart to save her daughter, sacrificing herself in the process.

She has since has appeared in almost every entry in the Soulcalibur series, with the exception being Soulcalibur V and the arcade release of Soulcalibur II, but included in home ports of the latter due to fan outcry. Originally voiced by Michiko Neya in Japanese, though Chie Nakamura has taken over voice acting duties since Soulcalibur Legends. In English she was voiced by Diane Holmby since Soulcalibur II, and then Erica Lindbeck in Soulcalibur VI. The character received some censorship in Western releases of Soul Edge and Soulcalibur, with the former covering her naked body with a white swimsuit in the game's opening cutscene while the latter removed a code that would allow players to change the color of her underwear. Outside of the series, she made a guest appearance in the Tecmo Koei hack and slash game Warriors Orochi 3 Ultimate, in which due to a time distortion she was transported to that game's setting. Unable to return, she chooses to help that world's heroes. In other media, Sophitia plays a lead role in the 1999 Soulcalibur Chinese manhua series, a retelling of the original Soul Edge and Soulcalibur games. She is furthermore featured in the collectible card game Universal Fighting System, and mobile card game Outcast Odyssey.

Fighting with a short sword and shield, Sophitia was designed as a character intended to be used by both long-time and brand new players. Her moveset provides her a large amount of flexibility, allowing her to act as a close to mid-range fighter. To this end several of her attacks will launch an opponent into the air and then juggle them for additional hits. However, as a slower character in the series many of her attacks can be sidestepped by the opponent, relying on her to either goad attacks or counterattack in order to be effective. Several of her attacks serve multiple purposes such as hitting low before following up with an airborne slash, while others have more range than their appearance would suggest. Due to her deceptive elements, she has been described as a technical character often favored by experienced players.

== Promotion and reception ==
Discussion about Sophitia revolves around the character's beauty and sexualization, emphasized by promotional artwork and unlockable game content

Namco released a Sophitia key chain figurine and a standing clock in its 1996 Soul Edge line, among other items such as window shades and table mats. Yujin released a four inch tall immobile figurine of Sophitia as part of their "Namco Girls Series #3" line of figurines for gashapon. Other commercial items bearing Sophitia's likeness include a resin kit designed by Hiroshi Satou for manufacturer Kurushima. Additionally, a 12-inch collectible statue of her was included with the special edition of Soulcalibur VI. Her likeness was also used as the basis for a costume for Sackboy in LittleBigPlanet 3, as part of a Soulcalibur themed costume pack for the title.

The character was very well received by the media and general public alike, especially amongst players in Japan. Named one of the best female characters on the Sega Dreamcast by the staff of Dreamcast Magazine in 2000, the staff heavily expressed their affection for her, particularly in regards to her "legs that go up to her armpits, flowing golden hair and looks of a model", adding that she "truly belongs on the catwalk." Bryan Johnson of GameSpy stated Sophitia became "one of the most easily recognized characters in the series" further adding that she remains one of "Soul Calibur's most memorable babes since the days of her swimsuit debut in Soul Blade." Spanish magazine Top Juegos featured her on a two-page spread, calling "practically the girl next door in comparison with the others" but further lauded her as "the exterminating angel, the herald of the gods, and above all, the most lubricious swordswoman who ever walked her charms for a screen." They additionally compared her "graceful movements" to ballet, heavily praising Yamashita's animation work on her character.

Other publications voiced similar sentiments. John Warren of Fanbyte noted that while Sophitia’s visual design wasn't unique, describing it as "every bit the classical warrior maiden", compared to the "bulky European armor and eastern fight-wear" of other characters in the series, she stood out visually and in regards to her gameplay. Jakub Kralka of benchmark.pl also heavily praised her, noting her popularity amongst other gaming websites and adding that she "to this day occupies high places in the rankings of the most alluring video game heroines", and further felt her movements coupled with her design made her a standout character in fighting games as a whole. Meanwhile, Princess Weekees of The Mary Sue praised Sophitia as an undervalued character in the franchise, stating that while she was attractive her backstory as a "baker turned warrior mom" is what made her attached to her the most, comparing her to the character Gabriella from the television series Xena: Warrior Princess "but sadly more heterosexual."

The staff of Chinese magazine Gamer named her one of the most beautiful female characters in video games, praising her as a character one couldn't find in real life. Examining her through the scope of Greek beauty standards, they stated while her face didn't fit such ideals, they felt the Ancient Greeks appreciated "a woman's healthy physique and elegant demeanor", something that they saw Sophitia as exemplifying and helped to make her popular with American and European audiences. They further described her aura as equally strong, pointing towards her revealing clothing as likely reflecting the Greek concept of allowing physical exposure for beautiful women. They praised her appearances across the first three Soulcalibur games, and expressed interest in possibly seeing a roleplaying game title that illustrated her storyline.

However, others were more critical of her design. The 2004 book Race, Gender, Media: Considering Diversity Across Audiences, Content, and Producers described Sophitia as oversexualized, with her outfit being the "micro mini version of the St. Pauli Girl frock", and further felt Sophitia was designed for solely the viewing pleasure heterosexual boys and men. In the paper Pretty Good for a Girl: A Feminist Content Analysis of Female Video Game Characters, and Interviews with Female Gamers, Elizabeth Munday stated Sophitia showed that the "real-world logic of protecting yourself during a fight was missing from the female character designs" in Soulcalibur, further noting that her outfit coupled with her large breasts and exposed thighs contributed to "an almost untouchable allure to the character", and emphasized the contrast between male and female characters in the series. Game designer Celia Pearce cited her among other characters as an example of "kombat lingerie", claiming her attire was more about the male fantasy of watching women in battle instead of female empowerment.

The changes to Sophitia's appearance throughout the series have also been discussed. Journalist Paul Tassi in an article for Topless Robot criticized the progressive changes, particularly in how her bust appeared to increase in size while her clothes became more revealing, stating while he was not opposed to attractive female characters, "there is a line that crosses into pure ridiculousness, and fighting games [...] regularly step over it". University of Delaware professor Rachel Hutchinson described Sophitia as the developer's "ideal figure of the western woman", noting as the series progresses she her hair gradually becomes more blonde and her outfit incorporates more blue, suggesting the blonde hair/blue eyes combination as a trait associated with Western character. She also noted Sophitia's designs growing more intricate as the series progressed, calling them "far from practical, focusing on the beauty and sexuality of the image and the grace of the character's movement", and tying into the increased mythical nature of the games.
