= Soulcalibur: Broken Destiny =

2009 video game

- Cover art depicting Kratos in the background, and Mitsurugi and Ivy in the front
- Developer: Project Soul
- Publishers: JP/NA: Namco Bandai Games (Note: Released under the Namco label in Japan.); EU: Ubisoft
- Composers: Junichi Nakatsuru; Keiki Kobayashi; Masaharu Iwata
- Series: Soulcalibur
- Platforms: PlayStation Portable, PlayStation 4, PlayStation 5
- Release: PSP: JP: August 27, 2009; NA: September 1, 2009; AU: September 3, 2009; EU: September 4, 2009; PS4/PS5: WW: December 14, 2023
- Genre: Fighting
- Modes: Single-player, multiplayer

Soulcalibur: Broken Destiny is a 2009 fighting game developed by Project Soul and published by Namco Bandai Games for the PlayStation Portable. A spin-off of the Soulcalibur series, the game uses many of the features of Soulcalibur IV, including its character customization mode. One of the goals of the game is "to target beginners and novice players with Soulcalibur IV's content". It introduces two new characters to the series: Kratos from the God of War series and Dampierre, a new original character. In December 2023, the game was released digitally on PlayStation 4 and PlayStation 5.

== Characters ==
Soulcalibur: Broken Destiny includes 28 characters. All regular characters from Soulcalibur IV return, but the bonus characters and Star Wars guest characters from Soulcalibur IV are absent. At the 2009 Electronic Entertainment Expo, Namco Bandai revealed that they were to be replaced with a different guest character — Kratos from Sony's God of War series, and a new exclusive character named Dampierre.

== Gameplay ==
The ability to change physical attributes and muscularity, which was present in Soulcalibur IV, has been removed. In this game, however, it has been replaced by the ability to adjust the rotation, position and size of some equipped items, such as certain headwear which might not fit exactly right, depending on what hairstyle is selected. Original characters can not be re-dressed with custom character items like in Soulcalibur IV, although their colors may be edited. In addition to editing the characters' appearance, the player may create a custom vs. screen photo for each custom character. The player has some control over the character's pose in the photo, as well as the camera position and the photo's frame and background. The number of custom character slots has been reduced from 50 in Soulcalibur IV to 16 in Broken Destiny.

Soulcalibur: Broken Destiny features an English language and Japanese language mode for both text and speech. Custom characters, however, can only be named using the ASCII naming interface, regardless of the language setting.

- Quick Match is a mode where players are given a list of A.I. players with their titles and stats and choose which opponent to fight. Players who have won against the A.I will receive "unique titles" that you can wear, the "title" is under their name during Versus Mode.
- The Gauntlet is the tutorial and story mode for Soulcalibur: Broken Destiny, which has similar story telling features like Soulcalibur II's Weapon Master mode, although the player is informed at the start that this story is non-canonical. Players are often given low health and required to guard or perform attacks within a short window of opening of the A.I. controlled tutor. There are altogether 34 chapters of tutorial in The Gauntlet, with two to four sub-missions in each of the stages. Players will need to clear all sub-missions with Rank A in order to unlock the next chapter. As a reward for completing The Gauntlet, players are given a new 'Broken Destiny' weapon for the character Siegfried.
- Trials consists of three portions — Trial of Attack, Trial of Defense, and Endless Trials. All of the portions are round-based battles. Trial of Attack rewards score according to how well a player can chain the attacks. Trial of Defense rewards score according to how well a player guard attacks and counterattacks. Endless Trials essentially combine both of the above trials and endless stages much like survival mode.
- Versus Mode is similar in features to Quick Match, except that the players are nearby PSP players who connect wirelessly through an ad hoc network.
- Training Mode which allows player to test out moves and practice in controlled condition, much the same as Practice Mode/Training in other previous Soulcalibur games.

== Release ==
On 30 April 2009, it was announced that Ubisoft would distribute the title in Europe and other PAL-region territories. (Note: Although announcements say that Ubisoft would only distribute the game, they are listed as the publisher on the packaging.)

== Reception ==
Reception

Aggregate score
| Aggregator | Score |
|---|---|
| Metacritic | 80/100 |

Review scores
| Publication | Score |
|---|---|
| Edge | 8/10 |
| Eurogamer | 8/10 |
| Famitsu | 31/40 |
| Game Informer | 7.5/10 |
| GamePro | 4/5 |
| GameRevolution | B+ |
| GameSpot | 7.5/10 |
| GameSpy | 3.5/5 |
| GameTrailers | 8.4/10 |
| GameZone | 8.5/10 |
| IGN | 8/10 |
| PlayStation: The Official Magazine | 4/5 |

Soulcalibur: Broken Destiny received "generally favorable" reviews from critics, according to review aggregator website Metacritic. Common criticism were a lack of story, game modes, and online versus modes. In Japan, Famitsu gave it a score of one seven and three eights for a total of 31 out of 40.
