= Hiroshi Tsuchida =

Japanese actor and voice actor (1972–2026)

- 土田 大
- Born: February 8, 1972; Tokyo, Japan
- Died: October 11, 2026 (aged 54)
- Occupations: Actor; voice actor
- Years active: 1994–2026
- Agent: 81 Produce
- Website: Official profile

Hiroshi Tsuchida (土田 大, Tsuchida Hiroshi; February 8, 1972 – October 11, 2026) was a Japanese actor affiliated with 81 Produce. He frequently dubbed character voices from English-language films into Japanese for the local market and was most well known for his anime roles as Saizo/Ninja Blue in Ninja Sentai Kakuranger and Grisha Jaeger in Attack on Titan.

Tsuchida's performance in a 1995 episode of Kakuranger where Saizo is surprised by an assassin who exclaims "Today is Friday in California!" and attempts to shoot him became a popular Internet meme in the early 2020s.

== Death ==
Hiroshi Tsuchida died from heart failure on October 11, 2026, at the age of 54. His death was announced by his agency days later, on October 20.

== Filmography ==
=== Television animation ===
- Naruto (2003) – Raido Namiashi
- One Piece (2004) – Capote
- Bobobo-bo Bo-bobo (2005) – Pana
- Honey and Clover (2005) – Kazushi Yamazaki
- The Wings of Rean (2005) – Rouri Yahan
- Buso Renkin (2006) – Kinjo
- Gintama (2007) – Marinosuke
- Skull Man (2007) – Skullman
- Soul Eater (2008) – Masamune Nakatsukasa
- Needless (2009) – Zakard
- Inazuma Eleven (2010) – Hidetoshi Nakata
- Steins;Gate (2011) – John Titor
- Bunny Drop (2011) – Daikichi Kawachi
- Attack on Titan (2013) – Grisha Yeager
- Pocket Monsters: XY (2013) – Dr. Platane (Professor Sycamore)
- Buddy Complex (2014) – Dorzhiev (ep 6-7)
- Tenkai Knights (2014) – Mr. Jones
- Argevollen (2014) – Ukyō Samonji
- Is It Wrong to Try to Pick Up Girls in a Dungeon? (2015) – Ganesha
- Pocket Monsters: XY&Z (2015) – Dr. Platane (Professor Sycamore)
- Fairy Tail (2015) – Ezel
- Attack on Titan Season 3 (2018) – Grisha Jaeger
- We Never Learn (2019) – Headmaster
- Cautious Hero: The Hero Is Overpowered but Overly Cautious (2019) – Eraser Kaiser
- Black Clover (2020) – Damnatio Kira
- Attack on Titan Season 4 (2021) – Grisha Jaeger
- Zombie Land Saga Revenge (2021) – Manager Nishimura
- Tropical-Rouge! Pretty Cure (2021) – Connie
- Platinum End (2022) – Masaya Hoshi
- Sweet Reincarnation (2023) – Casserole Mill Morteln
- Negative Positive Angler (2024) – Machida
- The Red Ranger Becomes an Adventurer in Another World (2025) – Shūji Kataoka/Kizuna Green
- Sakamoto Days (2025) – Asakura
- Mebius Dust (2026) – Shippo Marimo

=== Theatrical animation ===
- Apocalypse Meow (2010) – Sergeant Perkins
- New Initial D the Movie: Legend 1 - Awakening (2014) – Koichiro Iketani
- Blackfox (2019) – Allen

=== Web animation ===
- Mobile Suit Gundam Thunderbolt (2015) – J.J. Sexton
- Umamusume: Pretty Derby – Road to the Top (2023) – Trainer Okita
- Fool Night (2026) – Ken Hikasa

=== Original video animation (OVA) ===
- Mobile Suit Gundam: The Witch from Mercury Prologue (2022) – Nadim Samaya

=== Video games ===
- Tekken 5 (2004) – Feng Wei
- Atelier Iris 2: The Azoth of Destiny (2005) – Chaos
- Soulcalibur III (2005) – Zasalamel, Abyss
- Yakuza (2005) – Kazuki
- Kingdom Hearts II (2005) – Tron
- Bleach the King of Fighters SuperNOVA (2006) – Fuuma Monou
- Yakuza 2 (2006) – Kazuki
- Tekken 6 (2007) – Feng Wei
- Soulcalibur IV (2008) – Zasalamel
- Yakuza 3 (2009) – Kazuki
- Killzone 2 (2009) – Dante Garza
- Soulcalibur: Broken Destiny (2009) – Zasalamel
- Solatorobo: Red The Hunter (2010) – Gren Sacher
- Tekken Tag Tournament 2 (2011) – Feng Wei
- Ace Combat: Assault Horizon (2011) – William Bishop (Japanese dub)
- Soulcalibur V (2012) – Creation Male Reliable Leader
- Tekken 3D: Prime Edition (2012) – Feng Wei
- Dragon's Dogma: Dark Arisen (2013) – Maximilian
- Call of Duty: Ghosts (2013) – Keegan P. Russ
- Tekken 7 (2015) – Feng Wei
- Yakuza Kiwami (2016) – Kazuki
- Star Ocean: Integrity and Faithlessness (2016) – Gunter
- Nioh (2017) – Kuroda Nagamasa
- Yakuza Kiwami 2 (2017) – Kazuki
- Soulcalibur VI (2018) – Zasalamel
- Hatsune Miku: Colorful Stage! (2020) - Shindou Yoshiki
- Armored Core VI: Fires of Rubicon (2023) - G5 Iguazu
- Like a Dragon: Infinite Wealth (2024) – Kazuki
- Yakuza Kiwami 3 & Dark Ties (2026) – Kazuki

=== Live-action ===
- Ninja Sentai Kakuranger (1994) – Saizo / Ninja Blue
- Super Sentai World (1994) – Ninja Blue (voice)
- Toei Hero Daishugō (1994) – Ninja Blue (voice)
- Tokusou Sentai Dekaranger (2004) – Reversian Blitz Hells (ep. 21 - 23) (voice)
- Mahou Sentai Magiranger (2005) – Hades Beastman Kirikage the Ninja (ep. 22) (voice)
- Juuken Sentai Gekiranger (2007) – Confrontation Beast Mantis-Fist Makirika (ep. 1 & 2) (voice)
- Samurai Sentai Shinkenger (2009) – Ayakashi Yanasudare (ep. 5) (voice)
- Zyuden Sentai Kyoryuger (2013) – Debo Karyudosu (ep. 27 & 28) (voice)
- Uchu Sentai Kyuranger (2017) – Tecchuu (eps. 23 - 25, 29 & 30)/Akyachuuga (co-voiced with Naoya Uchida and Arisa Komiya) (ep. 42) (voice)
- Ultraman Decker (2022) – HANE2 (voice)
- No.1 Sentai Gozyuger (2026) - Vidal (ep. 44 - 46) (voice)

=== Dubbing roles ===
==== Live-action ====
- Joseph Gordon-Levitt
  - G.I. Joe: The Rise of Cobra – The Doctor/Rex/Cobra Commander
  - Inception – Arthur
  - The Dark Knight Rises – John Blake
  - Don Jon – Jon Martello
  - 7500 – Tobias Ellis
  - Project Power – Frank Shaver
- Scott Adkins
  - Assassination Games – Roland Flint
  - Universal Soldier: Day of Reckoning – John
  - Hard Target 2 – Wes Baylor
  - Boyka: Undisputed – Yuri Boyka
  - Accident Man – Mike Fallon / Accident Man
  - Accident Man: Hitman's Holiday – Mike Fallon / Accident Man
- Sean Gunn
  - Guardians of the Galaxy – Kraglin
  - Guardians of the Galaxy Vol. 2 – Kraglin
  - Thor: Love and Thunder – Kraglin
  - The Guardians of the Galaxy Holiday Special – Kraglin
  - Guardians of the Galaxy Vol. 3 – Kraglin
- 100 Things to Do Before High School – Jack Roberts (Jack De Sena)
- 11.22.63 – Jake Epping / James Amberson (James Franco)
- 15 Minutes of War – André Gerval (Alban Lenoir)
- 3 Idiots – Suhas Tandon (Olivier Sanjay Lafont)
- The 33 – Minister Laurence Golborne (Rodrigo Santoro)
- Absentia – Nick Durand (Patrick Heusinger)
- Agora – Orestes (Oscar Isaac)
- Air – Bauer (Norman Reedus)
- The Alamo – Juan Seguin (Jordi Mollà)
- American Assassin – "Ghost" (Taylor Kitsch)
- The Andromeda Strain – Dr. Tsi Chou (Daniel Dae Kim)
- Armageddon (2004 NTV edition) – Oscar Choice (Owen Wilson)
- Battle of the Year – Jason Blake (Josh Holloway)
- The Best of Me – Dawson Cole (James Marsden)
- Best Sellers – Jack Sinclair (Scott Speedman)
- Billy Lynn's Long Halftime Walk – Staff Sgt. David Dime (Garrett Hedlund)
- Bionic Woman – Jae Kim (Will Yun Lee)
- Boardwalk Empire – Richard Harrow (Jack Huston)
- Brothers – Capt. Sam Cahill (Tobey Maguire)
- The Butterfly Effect 3: Revelations – Lonnie Flennons
- The Captain – Kipinski (Frederick Lau)
- Clerks – Randal Graves (Jeff Anderson)
- Cold Case – Chris Lassing (Justin Chambers)
- Crusader – Hank Robinson (Andrew McCarthy)
- CSI: NY – Don Flack (Eddie Cahill)
- The Dark Knight – The Chechen (Ritchie Coster)
- Death at a Funeral – Justin (Ewen Bremner)
- The Deuce – Vincent Martino (James Franco)
- Disturbing the Peace – Marshall Jim Dillon (Guy Pearce)
- Eli Stone – Eli Stone (Jonny Lee Miller)
- Elysium – Max Da Costa (Matt Damon)
- Emergency Declaration – Park Jae-hyuk (Lee Byung-hun)
- Faces in the Crowd – Bryce (Michael Shanks)
- Fantastic Beasts and Where to Find Them – Henry Shaw, Jr. (Josh Cowdery)
- Fast Food Nation – Pete (Ethan Hawke)
- Fifty Shades Darker – Jack Hyde (Eric Johnson)
- Fifty Shades Freed – Jack Hyde (Eric Johnson)
- Fortitude – Sheriff Dan Anderssen (Richard Dormer)
- Generation Um... – John (Keanu Reeves)
- Grey's Anatomy – Alex Karev (Justin Chambers)
- Grudge Match – B.J. (Jon Bernthal)
- Haywire – Aaron (Channing Tatum)
- The Hurt Locker – Owen Eldridge (Brian Geraghty)
- Incendiary – Lenny (Nicholas Gleaves)
- Infinite – Evan McCauley / Heinrich Treadway 2020 (Mark Wahlberg)
- Instinct – Ryan Stock (Travis Van Winkle)
- Interstellar – Dr. Mann (Matt Damon)
- Jay and Silent Bob Strike Back (Netflix edition) – Holden McNeil (Ben Affleck)
- Jungle Cruise – Sancho (Dani Rovira)
- The Kennedys – Joseph P. Kennedy, Jr. (Gabriel Hogan)
- King Arthur: Legend of the Sword – King Arthur (Charlie Hunnam)
- Kung Fu Yoga – Jones Lee (Aarif Rahman)
- Life of Pi – The Writer (Rafe Spall)
- The Lord of the Rings: The Rings of Power – Stranger (Daniel Weyman)
- MacGyver – Jack Dalton (George Eads)
- Miracle – Jim Craig (Eddie Cahill)
- Munich – Steve (Daniel Craig)
- My Country: The New Age – Yi Bang-won (Jang Hyuk)
- My Way – Claude François (Jérémie Renier)
- Need for Speed – Dino Brewster (Dominic Cooper)
- The Next Best Thing – Kevin Lasater (Michael Vartan)
- Once Upon a Time – Captain Killian "Hook" Jones (Colin O'Donoghue)
- The Originals – Klaus Mikaelson (Joseph Morgan)
- The Pacific – GySgt. John Basilone (Jon Seda)
- Pacific Rim – Yancy Becket (Diego Klattenhoff)
- Pirates of the Caribbean: On Stranger Tides – King Ferdinand (Sebastian Armesto)
- Power Rangers Lost Galaxy – Mike Corbett/Magna Defender (Russell Lawrence), Auctioneer (Michael Sorich)
- Power Rangers Lightspeed Rescue – Triskull (Michael Sorich)
- The Proposal – Andrew Paxton (Ryan Reynolds)
- Quarantine – Jake (Jay Hernandez)
- REC 3: Genesis – Koldo (Diego Martin)
- Red Dawn – Jed Eckert (Chris Hemsworth)
- Red Water – Brett van Ryan (Langley Kirkwood)
- Roman J. Israel, Esq. – George Pierce (Colin Farrell)
- The Roundup – Oh Dong-gyun (Heo Dong-won)
- S. Darko – Randy Holt (Ed Westwick)
- Scary Movie 3 - Ross Giggins (Jeremy Piven)
- Secretariat – Seth Hancock (Drew Roy)
- Seven Psychopaths – Martin "Marty" Faranan (Colin Farrell)
- Shorts – Mr. Bill Thompson (Jon Cryer)
- Snowpiercer – Curtis Everett (Chris Evans)
- Solo: A Star Wars Story – Dryden Vos (Paul Bettany)
- Source Code – Derek Frost (Michael Arden)
- Space Jam: A New Legacy – Malik (Khris Davis)
- Squid Game – Hwang In-ho (Lee Byung-hun)
- Street Kings – Detective Paul Diskant (Chris Evans)
- Tears of the Sun – James "Red" Atkins (Cole Hauser)
- Tomb Raider – Bill (Billy Postlethwaite)
- Torque – Val (Will Yun Lee)
- Total Recall – Marek (Will Yun Lee)
- The Town – Douglas "Doug" MacRay (Ben Affleck)
- Transformers: Age of Extinction – Cade Yeager (Mark Wahlberg)
- Transformers: The Last Knight – Cade Yeager (Mark Wahlberg)
- Tron – Alan Bradley (Bruce Boxleitner)
- Tron: Legacy – Edward Dillinger, Jr. (Cillian Murphy)
- Unbroken – Mutsuhiro "The Bird" Watanabe (Miyavi)
- Valkyrie – Lieutenant Werner von Haeften (Jamie Parker)
- The Walking Dead – Rick Grimes (Andrew Lincoln)
- Warcraft – Anduin Lothar (Travis Fimmel)
- Warrior – Tommy Riordan Conlon (Tom Hardy)
- Welcome to the Jungle – Phil (Rob Huebel)
- Wrath of the Titans – Ares (Édgar Ramírez)
- Vice – Evan (Bryan Greenberg)

==== Animation ====
- Cars – Lightning McQueen
- Cars 2 – Lightning McQueen
- Cars 3 – Lightning McQueen
- Kpop Demon Hunters – Gwi-Ma
- Minions: The Rise of Gru – Dr. Nefario
- Teenage Mutant Ninja Turtles (2012 TV series) – Donatello
- Thomas & Friends – Stanley
