= Soulcalibur: Lost Swords =

2014 video game

- Cover art depicting Sophitia and Siegfried
- Developer: Bandai Namco Studios
- Publisher: Bandai Namco Games
- Producer: Masaki Hoshino
- Series: Soulcalibur
- Platform: PlayStation 3
- Release: JP: February 6, 2014; NA: April 22, 2014; EU: April 23, 2014; until Nov 30, 2015
- Genre: Fighting
- Mode: Single-player

Soulcalibur: Lost Swords was a 2014 free-to-play fighting game developed by Bandai Namco Studios and published by Bandai Namco Games distributed through PlayStation Network. The game is based on Soulcalibur V (2012) and is strictly single-player. It used the same weapon-based fighting system from previous games; however, several of the gameplay mechanics were changed, simplified or otherwise removed.

The game was also periodically updated with new content, including new events, items, and characters. The game ceased operations effective in 2015.

== Gameplay ==
Like previous games in the series, Soulcalibur: Lost Swords was a weapon-based fighting game. Players could inflict high and low horizontal and vertical attacks, block oncoming attacks, and use parries to gain a tactical advantage. Features such as Soul Crush and Armor Destruction first introduced in Soulcalibur IV have been retained; Soul Crush could be used to make opponents drop collectible items and weapons. Several mechanics were no longer present in the game, however, such as the ability to ring out a character, counter hits, and Just Guard. Guard Impact, while having the same properties as Soulcalibur V, no longer used a specific meter to execute. Two new mechanics were added: Weapon Arts, which granted each character unique attacks such as breaking through an enemy's guards; and support character feature, which allowed players to temporarily borrow another player's character online.

The game featured single-player experience modes. In Quest Mode, players traversed the world to participate in battles which allowed them to collect raw materials and weapons; the former could be used to craft better weapons for use. As the existing characters no longer wore predetermined costumes and started out with only undergarments, players could customize them with various armory and other clothing parts. Virtual item sales were offered online. Similar to other free-to-play titles like Tekken Revolution, microtransactions were offered, some of which removing the playtime limit of the game.

== Characters ==
The game offered three characters as part of the default character roster: Mitsurugi, Siegfried, and Sophitia. Once the player would choose one, that character would be their sole playable character for the rest of the game unless the player collected character keys by completing quests, which would unlock the others. Fourteen additional characters: Amy, Astaroth, Cassandra, Cervantes, Hilde, Ivy, Leixia, Maxi, Nightmare, Patroklos, Pyrrha, Raphael, Seong Mi-na, and Taki, could be unlocked as a result of various in-game events. Characters' appearances were in accordance with their most recent models (Soulcalibur IV and V), with the exception of Astaroth, whose design was carried over from Soulcalibur II.

== Development ==
The title Soulcalibur: Lost Swords was trademarked by Namco in August 2013. The game was unveiled on September 10, 2013, via the Japanese gaming magazine Famitsu, which stated that the game would be free-to-play and would feature virtual item sales. Further information revealed that it would also feature new gameplay mechanics, including Weapon Arts, and the game's focus would be collecting and crafting weapons. The game's teaser trailer was shown during a press event in Tokyo, which also confirmed the return of Sophitia. Starting on November 12, 2013, Namco Bandai released character trailers showcasing battle demo of each character.

The beta version test kicked off on November 14 through 18, 2013 for Japan, which offered Mitsurugi, Siegfried and Sophitia as playable characters as well as two virtual items. On December 19, 2013, the game's release date was pushed back to February 6, 2014, with Namco stating that the delay would be used to further increase the quality of the game. A promotional trailer was released on February 3, 2014, in anticipation of the game's Japanese release, showing new features such as the Quest Mode and elemental attacks.

On March 30, 2014, during a Namco Bandai live broadcast, titled "876 Minute" on Niconico, a poll was conducted to determine the most favorite character who did not make an appearance in Soulcalibur V. The four choices were Amy, Cassandra, Rock, and Seong Mi-na. Amy received the most votes, at 39.7%, followed by Seong Mi-na (23.8%), Rock (20.8%), and Cassandra (15.7%). In the April 15, 2014 publication of Dengeki magazine, which confirmed the addition of Taki to the character roster, Namco Bandai announced that the game would see release worldwide sometime at the end of the month. It was later revealed that Lost Swords would be available in the North American PlayStation Store on April 22, 2014, coinciding with a server maintenance for the Japanese version of the game. Producer Masaaki Hoshino revealed that multiplayer was left out because the game uses a pay-to-win model.

Another poll was conducted by Bandai Namco on the month of May 2015. It was again a character popularity poll, though it included all characters who have appeared in the Soul series so far, not just characters who did not make appearance in Soulcalibur V. It was, however, a general poll and not necessarily connected to Lost Swords. The poll was conducted on the official Soulcalibur Facebook page. Voting ended on May 31, 2015, and the results showed Talim (a character who did not appear in either Soulcalibur V or Lost Swords) as the most popular character, followed by Taki and Mitsurugi.

Bandai Namco announced on September 1, 2015, that it would cease operations of Lost Swords on November 30, 2015. Several send-off events were held, including ranking events and item sales.

== Reception ==
Reception

Aggregate score
Aggregator	Score
Metacritic	38/100

Review scores
Publication	Score
Eurogamer	3/10
GamesTM	5/10

Soulcalibur: Lost Swords was poorly received by critics. Eurogamer criticized the game's significant loading times and the changes in the gameplay system, including the removal of ring outs and the lack of multiplayer, as well as the new focus on monetization.

According to a Bandai Namco press release on May 8, 2014, Soulcalibur: Lost Swords had surpassed over 1.4 million downloads on the PlayStation Network. As of September 2015, the game has been downloaded over 2 million times.
