= Characters of the Soulcalibur series =

Soulcalibur series
- The cast of Soulcalibur. The series features a variety of characters and fighting styles.
- First appearance: Soul Edge (1996)
- Last appearance: Soulcalibur VI (2018)
- Created by: Bandai Namco
- Designed by: Project Soul

The following is a comprehensive list of characters from the Soulcalibur series of video games, beginning with Soul Edge (Soul Blade in the PlayStation version) in 1995.

== Overview and development ==
Soulcalibur is a weapon-based fighting game franchise developed by Namco Bandai's Project Soul division. Set in the period of late 16th to early 17th century, the plot of the games revolve around Soul Edge, a cursed sword able to possess its wielder and devour souls. Its spirit is called Inferno, and his avatar/host is called Nightmare. Soul Calibur, a holy sword and Soul Edge's antithesis, also has a spirit called Elysium.

When creating characters for the series, they started with the weapon first, aiming to choose one that would feel unique amongst the cast. The character concepts themselves are then built around the chosen weapon, with their movement, animations and personality designed to fit it. According to series creator Hirokai Yotoriyama, movement is the first element they focus on, deciding how the character will attack, and how mobile they are. Afterwards the character is defined down to their weight, height, age, and gender, and then developed by the concept artists. Afterwards a 3D model team is assigned to work on that character exclusively, with little overlap between the individual teams. Motion capture is then utilized for character movement and animation, though in select cases the design team will animate the character by hand instead. During the phase the designers will work with the story creators, refining the character's role in the plot as necessary. Some characters have been an exception to this process, such as Necrid, a character co-produced with Todd McFarlane that appears in Soulcalibur II.

Starting with Soulcalibur II, guest characters from other franchises or companies were introduced for different home ports of the game, with The Legend of Zelda's Link appearing for the GameCube version, comic book character Spawn for the Xbox, and Tekken's Heihachi Mishima for the PlayStation 2. Despite rumors of Devil May Cry's Dante's inclusion in Soulcalibur III, developers confirmed no plans for the inclusion of guest characters for the title, with series producer Hiroaki Yotoriyama stating "It's my policy to never do the same thing twice." However, under new producer Katsutoshi Sasaki the concept was revisited in later titles in the series, with Tales of Symphonia's Lloyd Irving appearing in Soulcalibur Legends, Star Wars characters The Apprentice, Yoda and Darth Vader appearing in Soulcalibur IV, with the latter two exclusively to the Xbox 360 and PlayStation 3 versions respectively until later released as downloadable content, God of War's Kratos for Soulcalibur: Broken Destiny, and Ezio Auditore da Firenze from the Assassin's Creed franchise for Soulcalibur V. Devil Jin from Tekken was also added to Soulcalibur V as a non-playable character and his moveset can only be accessed by creating a character that uses his style of fighting. Soulcalibur VI added Geralt of Rivia from The Witcher, 2B from Nier: Automata and Haohmaru from Samurai Shodown as guest characters.

== Character appearances ==
Below is a table of all the notable characters and their appearances throughout the series, as either playable characters or bosses.

Character	Weapon	Soul Edge	Soulcalibur	II	III	IV	V	VI	Legends	Broken Destiny	Lost Swords	Unbreakable Soul
Algol	Sword	No	No	No	No	Yes	Yes	No	No	Yes	No	No
Amy/Viola	Rapier/Crystal ball	No	No	No	Yes	Yes	Yes	DLC	No	Yes	Yes	No
Arthur	Katana	No	Yes	No	Yes	No	No	No	No	No	No	No
Astaroth	Battle axe	No	Yes	Yes	Yes	Yes	Yes	Yes	Yes	Yes	Yes	Yes
Azwel	Enchanted gauntlets	No	No	No	No	No	No	Yes	No	No	No	No
Cassandra	Sword and shield	No	No	Yes	Yes	Yes	No	DLC	No	Yes	Yes	Yes
Cervantes	Sword	Yes	Yes	Yes	Yes	Yes	Yes	Yes	Yes	Yes	Yes	Yes
Charade	Various	No	No	Yes	Yes	No	No	No	No	No	No	No
Dampierre	Daggers	No	No	No	No	No	DLC	No	No	Yes	No	Yes
Edge Master	All	No	Yes	No	No	No	Yes	No	No	No	No	Yes
Elysium	Sword	No	No	No	No	No	Yes	No	No	No	Yes	No
Grøh	Sabre	No	No	No	No	No	No	Yes	No	No	No	No
Hilde	Sword and spear	No	No	No	No	Yes	Yes	DLC	No	Yes	Yes	No
Hwang	Chinese sword	Yes	Yes	No	Yes	No	No	DLC	No	No	No	Yes
Inferno	Various	Yes	Yes	Yes	Yes	No	No	Yes	No	No	No	Yes
Ivy	Snake sword	No	Yes	Yes	Yes	Yes	Yes	Yes	Yes	Yes	Yes	Yes
Kilik	Bō staff	No	Yes	Yes	Yes	Yes	Yes	Yes	No	Yes	No	Yes
Leixia	Jian	No	No	No	No	No	Yes	No	No	No	Yes	No
Li Long	Nunchaku	Yes	No	No	Yes	No	No	No	No	No	No	No
Lizardman / Aeon Calcos	Sword and shield	No	Yes	No	Yes	Yes	Yes	No	No	Yes	No	Yes
Maxi	Nunchaku	No	Yes	Yes	Yes	Yes	Yes	Yes	No	Yes	Yes	Yes
Mitsurugi	Katana	Yes	Yes	Yes	Yes	Yes	Yes	Yes	Yes	Yes	Yes	Yes
Natsu	Ninjatō	No	No	No	No	No	Yes	No	No	No	No	No
Necrid	Enigma	No	No	Yes	No	No	No	No	No	No	No	No
Night Terror	Sword	No	No	No	Yes	No	No	No	No	No	No	No
Nightmare	Zweihander	No	Yes	Yes	Yes	Yes	Yes	Yes	Yes	Yes	Yes	Yes
Olcadan	All	No	No	No	Yes	No	No	No	No	No	No	No
Patroklos	Sword and shield	No	No	No	No	No	Yes	No	No	No	Yes	No
Pyrrha	Sword and shield	No	No	No	No	No	Yes	No	No	No	Yes	No
Raphael	Rapier	No	No	Yes	Yes	Yes	Yes	Yes	No	Yes	Yes	No
Rock	Battle axe	Yes	Yes	No	Yes	Yes	No	No	No	Yes	No	Yes
Seong Mi-na	Naginata	Yes	Yes	Yes	Yes	Yes	No	Yes	No	Yes	Yes	Yes
Setsuka	Iaitō/umbrella	No	No	No	Yes	Yes	No	DLC	No	Yes	No	No
Siegfried	Zweihänder	Yes	Yes	Yes	Yes	Yes	Yes	Yes	Yes	Yes	Yes	Yes
Sophitia	Sword and shield	Yes	Yes	Yes	Yes	Yes	No	Yes	Yes	Yes	Yes	Yes
Taki	Ninjatō	Yes	Yes	Yes	Yes	Yes	No	Yes	Yes	Yes	Yes	Yes
Talim	Tonfa	No	No	Yes	Yes	Yes	No	Yes	No	Yes	No	No
Tira	Ring blade	No	No	No	Yes	Yes	Yes	DLC	No	Yes	No	No
Voldo	Katars	Yes	Yes	Yes	Yes	Yes	Yes	Yes	No	Yes	No	Yes
Xianghua	Jian	No	Yes	Yes	Yes	Yes	No	Yes	No	Yes	No	Yes
Xiba	Bō staff	No	No	No	No	No	Yes	No	No	No	No	No
Yoshimitsu	Katana	No	Yes	Yes	Yes	Yes	Yes	Yes	No	Yes	No	Yes
Yun-Seong	Chinese sword	No	No	Yes	Yes	Yes	No	No	No	Yes	No	No
Zasalamel	Scythe	No	No	No	Yes	Yes	No	Yes	No	Yes	No	No
Z.W.E.I.	Sword	No	No	No	No	No	Yes	No	No	No	No	No

== Introduced in Soul Edge ==
=== Cervantes ===
Voiced by (English): Warren Rodgerson (SCII) Wally Wingert (SCIII to SC:BD) Patrick Seitz (SCV to SCVI)
Voiced by (Japanese): Takashi Nagasako (SC~SCIII); Jin Urayama (SCL~SCV); Hiroshi Shirokuma (SCVI)

Cervantes de Leon (セルバンテス・デ・レオン, Serubantesu de Reon) was a privateer who was sent on a mission by the King of Spain to loot in the name of Spain. Following a disastrous attack on an English warship that killed Philip, Cervantes forsook his allegiance to the king and became a pirate. Receiving an order from a wealthy merchant to find the cursed sword Soul Edge, Cervantes voyaged through the sea and eventually found the sword in the possession of an English dealer who specialized in rare weapons. However, the sword gradually corrupted him until his soul was devoured by it. Having murdered all of his crew, Cervantes boarded his ghost ship on a reign of terror for twenty years until he was defeated and killed by the combined efforts of Greek warrior Sophitia and Japanese ninja Taki.

However, Cervantes was accidentally resurrected without his memory by Nightmare because of the Soul Edge fragments lodged in his body, transformed into an undead. For the next three years, he decided to search for the cursed sword despite knowing that it had robbed him of his free will while slowly recovering his memories. Upon the shattering of Soul Edge, Cervantes began his quest on collecting the fragments of the cursed sword for four years which melded to form a weapon for him, attacking other ships that came close to his sea. When the presence of Soul Edge's other half vanished, Cervantes's body began to weaken as the fragments that sustained him crumbled. He was informed by a servant of Soul Edge, Tira, that a powerful entity was the one responsible, so Cervantes sought to defeat the entity and preserve his life. Eventually, Soul Edge summoned all pieces of itself back to it. Cervantes followed its trail, intending to wield the sword once it completed itself. Along the way, he devoured the soul of his illegitimate daughter, Ivy, but after the latter had survived thanks to her artificial soul, Ivy retaliated and defeated Cervantes, releasing all souls he had consumed, including hers. His body beaten and his mind shattered, Cervantes was swallowed by a dimensional rift opened by Soul Edge.

Seventeen years later, during the wake of the 17th century, people reported the presence of Cervantes' ship, voyaging through the sea; Cervantes had been released from the rift, now free from Soul Edge's control and at his height of power.

In the non-canonical Gauntlet storyline of Soulcalibur: Broken Destiny, Cervantes' soul was required as payment for Ivy to create a potion for Hilde and her party to cure her father. Though they attempted to renegotiate, they were forced to find and take Cervantes' soul by force.

=== Hwang ===
Voiced by (English): SungWon Cho (SCVI (Version 2.30))
Voiced by (Japanese): Toshiyuki Morikawa (SE (Arcade)); Wataru Takagi (SE (Console)~SC); Naoki Imamura (SCIII); Subaru Kimura (SCVI (Version 2.30))

Hwang Seong-gyeong (ファン・ソンギョン, Fan Songyon), is a young Korean man with a strong sense of justice; he joined Korea's coast guard and was sent to find the "Sword of Salvation", which in reality is the cursed sword Soul Edge, in order to protect his country. However, he returned after learning of an impending Japanese invasion of his homeland, bringing his friend's daughter, Seong Mi-na, back with him. When he set out after her again, he discovered the true nature of the sword and informed his superiors of it. They dismissed him as a result, but upon learning that the Japanese were also after the sword, he was instead sent to stop them. Heading westward, he plans to join forces with Seong Mi-na to destroy the blade. In Soulcalibur IV, he was in Ostrheinsburg when he crossed paths with Hong Yun-seong, a student of the Seong dojo. Hwang tried to warn him the danger of Soul Edge, though the young warrior did not heed his warning and continued his journey to find the sword. After Soul Edge is destroyed, he is deemed a national hero and begins training in the new generation, alongside Mi-na and Yun-seong.

In a new timeline depicted in Soulcalibur VI, Hwang was forcefully being implanted with the evil seed and almost transformed into a malfested by Won Gabok, a servant of Soul Edge. He managed to injure himself and was thought to have committed suicide. However, Hwang survived and was saved by Woo Soo-yun, an ally of the Aval Organization and by extension, the Wolfkrone Kingdom, including Hwang's deceased parents. Hwang masters Taoism for three months to suppress the malfestation from taking over his body and countermeasure any other malfestation threats.

During development several weapons were considered, including a zhanmadao like Seong Mi-Na's and a bladed nunchaku like Li Long's. Several different outfit components were also considered at this time, such as the inclusion of head or arm guards and an arm bandana. With Hwang's appearance in Soulcalibur his attire was changed. Chinese style costumes were considered, including an outfit with an open jacket and a bandaged design with a Chinese martial artist's attire. The developers based his look around the concept of a traveler, implementing subtle hints such as his torn pant legs. Hwang appears in Soulcalibur VI, although he was not playable until being made available as downloadable content. He eventually learns Taoism to combine its power with his original sword technique.

=== Inferno ===
Inferno (インフェルノ, Inferuno) is the physical manifestation of the cursed sword Soul Edge's own soul and the true antagonist within Soul series as his Nightmare incarnation, where it mostly started out as the final boss in Soul Edge (originally listed as "SoulEdge") until Soulcalibur II, including the reboot/retelling game Soulcalibur VI. It fights using the attack style of other fighters from its memories of past battles and will switch to a random one at the start of each round. Though it exists in its own dimension, Astral Chaos (a realm where time and space never exist), it has used duplicity such as in the case of tricking Siegfried into expanding its will, and in more extreme cases utilized Cervantes' flaming corpse and later the remnants of Nightmare's armor to create an avatar for itself. Within Astral Chaos, Inferno can manifest itself as a flaming and mostly skeletal body for itself, creating weapons to match whichever fighting style it currently uses, particularly Siegfried's being its primary likeness at most part.

Inferno, along with Soul Edge is destroyed by Siegfried at the end of Soulcalibur IV, though its will continues to live in the leftover shards of Soul Edge and later manifests itself in a new Soul Edge. However, after the new Nightmare, Graf Dumas (heavily hinted to be Raphael Sorel) was slain, Inferno choose Pyrrha as its new host until being defeated by her brother and Soul Edge along with Soul Calibur were both sealed away in the Astral Chaos realm. Its will and power has, directly and indirectly, affected several other characters in the series, such as the Evil Seed event that caused many to turn somewhat evil or insane. It has also caused the creation of several life forms or modification of them, such as Ivy's sword, Charade, Necrid, and Abyss.

In Soulcalibur VI, Inferno's gameplay is similar to his original Soul Edge counterpart, as being more of an enhanced version of certain Soul Edge wielders than as a mimic fighter; in this case, its main alter-ego Nightmare instead of Cervantes. Due to his final boss role despite being an unlockable character, Inferno is banned from online matches and official tournaments.

=== Li Long ===
Voiced by (English) Dan Woren (SCIII)
Voiced by (Japanese): Jin Yamanoi (SE); Masaya Takatsuka (SCIII)

Li Long (リ・ロン, Ri Ron) is an assassin sent by the Emperor of China to kill a pirate lord, but failed. Badly injured, he was rescued by a female ninja named Chie and eventually they fell in love. One day, her former comrades caught up with them and she was believed to be dead. Told falsely Heishiro Mitsurugi was responsible, he set out after Soul Edge knowing Mitsurugi was also after the blade. Along the way he takes the weapons of other fighters he defeats, repurposing some for his own use. Upon finding and defeating Mitsurugi, he realized the swordsman had no part in the attack upon Chie, and continued his goal of searching for Soul Edge. He located its wielder, Cervantes, but was beaten severely and lost an eye. In Soulcalibur III, he found himself on the run from assassins sent by his Chie's former clan leader. Traveling by night under a false name, he was taken in by a girl that reminded him of Chie, and chose to stand his ground when the assassins found him. After defeating them he set out to find himself, not knowing that Chie was actually alive and had set out to find him with their newborn son. By Soulcalibur V it is revealed he has reunited with his family, and they now live with the ninja Taki's clan.

Li Long's weapon is a pair of nunchaku with mounted blades; however, due to a ban of nunchaku weapons in the United Kingdom, they were changed to a three-sectioned staff for the European release of Soul Blade. His facial contours, expressions and hairstyle were designed to suggest the "assassin" side of his character and to depict his representation of Chinese culture.

=== Mitsurugi ===
Voiced by (English): Scott Keck (SCII); Ed Cunnigham (SCIII to SCV); Ray Chase (SCVI)
Voiced by (Japanese): Toshiyuki Morikawa (SC~)

In the backstory of Soul Edge, Heishiro Mitsurugi (御剣 平四郎, Mitsurugi Heishirō) is an orphaned son of a Japanese farmer, who after suffering years of witnessing his homeland being ravaged by bandits and war, decided to take up swordsmanship. At the age of 14, having picked up a sword and the last name Mitsurugi, he went to train under the Murakami clan. Mitsurugi, noted as a great warrior, received numerous commendations and rose in the ranks, but his only true desire was a worthy opponent. After leaving the Murakami clan, Mitsurugi continued to fight in the great civil war in Japan as a hired mercenary. Having originally dismissed the firearm as a novelty, he was shocked to see the riflemen obliterate the Takeda cavalry at the Battle of Nagashino. He decided he needed to find a stronger weapon for himself: the magic sword of legend, Soul Edge.

Mitsurugi encountered the female ninja Taki during this time, but was unable to find any trace of the legendary "Hero's Sword". In his frustration at finding no signs of Soul Edge, he returned home and challenged Teppou Hei, a man wielding the tanegashima, to a duel. However, Mitsurugi suffered an embarrassing defeat, leaving him with a scar of a gunshot wound on his right shoulder and forcing him to depart in shame on a second quest to perfect his swordsmanship so that he might eventually defeat the gun. It was during this quest that he learned of the Azure Knight, Nightmare, who terrorized Europe with a sword deemed invincible, and set out after him in order to find what he considered a worthy challenge (this being his motivation through the remainder of the series since Soulcalibur). Nightmare's trail eventually disappeared, but Mitsurugi was unwilling to give up, and gradually improved his fighting style to the point riflemen were no longer a threat. Returning from his quest, Mitsurugi challenged Teppou Hei again, but this time Mitsurugi managed to kill the man with a single strike with his sword.

Four years later, during the events of Soulcalibur II, Mitsurugi stumbled upon the trail of Soul Edge while visiting a castle in Xiwei, where a mysterious dying man, after being saved by him from a group of assassins, handed him a shard of the cursed blade. Although skeptical at first, Mitsurugi accepted the gift. Soon afterward, an incident occurred in which a servant of the Chinese Emperor of Ming marched to the castle, demanding the "Hero's Sword", and was slain when he refused to leave without it. Mitsurugi sensed that war was coming, but Soul Edge meant nothing to him. He had crossed countless battlefields, defeating every conceivable enemy, even those with rifles. What had once been his greatest enemy was none of his concern, as it no longer proved to be a threat. His only concern was with finding an opponent stronger than himself. Wondering what was happening in Japan at that time, and whether or not he could have a final showdown with Taki, he decided to return to his homeland.

By the time of Soulcalibur III and Soulcalibur IV, the Murakami clan, with whom Mitsurugi stayed upon his return, refused to join with Toyotomi Hideyoshi, choosing instead to protect their existence as fierce pirates and rulers of the sea. Since Mitsurugi could find no trace of Taki, he went to aid the Murakami and aided them in their naval victory. Soon, he learned of the arrival of Nightmare, whom he had lost track of before. Mitsurugi left the Murakami and went to the West again. Ever-searching for a worthy adversary to test his skills, Mitsurugi journeyed to Ostrheinsburg, where he entered a chaotic alternate dimension and faced the Hero King, Algol, high atop a colossal tower. The two warriors clashed when suddenly Algol disappeared, along with the tower and all their surroundings—a dimensional convergence had warped Mitsurugi back to reality before the duel could be decided. He had also unknowingly make rival with Setsuka, after he mortally wounded her master during a battle that eventually led to his death, although he did not realize it until they fight sometime during the events of Soulcalibur IV, at which he defeated her by stunning Setsuka with a punch, but lost his katana Shishi-Oh in the battle.

In Soulcalibur V, after the warring period of Japan had ended, Mitsurugi has settled a quiet life as a farmer for seventeen years. He regains his fighting spirit when he heard about Soul Calibur and goes on a journey to once again continue the battle with Algol that was left unfinished years before.

A young Mitsurugi returns in the reboot/altered timeline-themed game Soulcalibur VI. It was revealed that his failed attempt to fight Nightmare is because Taki was sent by Edge Master to keep him away from end having an awful encounter with the Azure Knight. Misturugi made a friendly rivalry with a universe-displaced The Witcher’s protagonist Geralt of Rivia from CD Projekt, and his long waited rival who is also his counterpart, Samurai Shodown’s protagonist Haohmaru from SNK Corporation.

Mitsurugi also appeared in Namco × Capcom as a playable character along with Taki, with whom he makes a temporary alliance there. He also appears as a limited card in Outcast Odyssey. Yuri Lowell from the Tales series can wear Mitsurugi's costume as his alternate outfit. He is also referenced in Ridge Racer 6 with the car named Mitsurugi Meltfire.

Former Fanbyte editor-in-chief John Warren described him as "arguably the most recognizable character from the Soulcalibur series", adding that "Mitsurugi's design isn't revelatory by any stretch. Yet its consistency over the years and his genuine, ineffable coolness" made him one of the top characters in the series. Nathan Ditum from PlayStation Official Magazine – UK chose him as his personal favourite out of the cast of Soulcalibur V.

=== Rock ===
Voiced by (English): Robert Belgrade (SE) Wally Burr (SCIII) David Jeremiah (SCIV to SC:BD)
Voiced by (Japanese): Takashi Nagasako (SE~SC); Minoru Inaba (SCIII); Tōru Ōkawa (SCIV~)

Rock (ロック, Rokku), born as Nathaniel William Adams, is the son of an English dealer who specialized in rare weapons. His father managed to bid Soul Edge at one auction and was about to take it home, only for the ship to be attacked by the pirate Cervantes, who killed everyone except Rock, who washed up in the shores of North America with his memories gone. The Native Americans were unwilling to help Rock due to his size and only a boy named Bangoo was unafraid to befriend him. Rock eventually recovered his memories over time and left America in search of Soul Edge, which may become the key to his full memories. Through Sophitia's words, he returned to care for Bangoo, only to find him being kidnapped by Lizardman / Aeon Calcos, whose cult demanded Rock's soul. He crossed back to Europe and rescued Bangoo. They stayed in Europe for several years until Bangoo grew older, after which Bangoo went to America by himself. Later, Rock is attacked by a giant named Astaroth, whose moves have an uncanny resemblance to his own. He learned that Astaroth was created by Lizardman's cult based on his image and is now serving Nightmare. Rock is determined to stop him at all costs. His fate afterward is not known, as no explanation is given for his absence in Soulcalibur V.

Initially during development, the character was called "Beast Warrior", and his design changed little over the course of creating the character. His appearance is intended to reflect the atmosphere of a wild warrior, while his facial expressions were drawn in a positive manner, intended to show him enjoying the fight. When developing his appearance for Soulcalibur, a clothed design and a bald appearance were both rejected, as the team felt they gave the impression of an urban or "bad guy" character, respectively.

=== Seong Han-myeong ===
Seong Han-myeong (ソン・ハンミョン, Son Hanmyon) is the father of Seong Mi-na and the owner of the Seong dojo. He only appeared as a secret character in the console version of Soul Edge, utilizing a Chinese sword akin to Hwang. After his wife and son both died of illness, he trained his daughter in martial arts but wished her to stay home, despite her rebellious nature. He became interested in a student of his, Hwang Seong-gyeong, and tried to adopt him as his successor, although Hwang politely rejected the offer. Regardless, Han-myeong planned to marry his daughter with Hwang, which only caused Mi-na to run away from home for months, although she was eventually dragged back home by Hwang. When a malfested army invades his dojang to hunt Mi-na for her involvement and lure Hwang (who is now also a Taoist in Soulcalibur VI), Han-myeong learns Soul Edge's evil nature from his student. Later, another student of his, Hong Yun-seong ran away from his dojo to find Soul Edge and Han-myeong reluctantly gave his blessing to his daughter in an attempt to find him, yet entrust her to prevent Yun-seong from nearing Soul Edge.

=== Siegfried ===
Voiced by (English): Crispin Freeman (SCIII); Roger Craig Smith (SCL~SCV) Kirk Thornton (SCVI)
Voiced by (Japanese): Nobuyuki Hiyama (SC~)

Siegfried Schtauffen (ジークフリート・シュタウフェン, Jīkufurīto Shutaufen) was born to Sir Frederick Schtauffen, a brave knight who was considered a champion among the oppressed peasants of his German hometown in the Holy Roman Empire, and a woman named Margaret who met Frederick while he was on campaign, during the late 16th century. He was given the name Siegfried after the legendary Germanic hero, and was taught swordsmanship by his father.

Frederick embarked on a foreign crusade and, due to lack of guidance in life, Siegfried unintentionally murdered his returning father while rampaging as the leader of a teenage band of thieves calling themselves "Schwarzwind" (German translation for "black wind"). Siegfried grew in despair and eventually convinced himself that anyone but he was to blame for his father's death. Siegfried had heard rumours of the invincible Soul Edge, and came to believe his father's killer could only be killed with that weapon.

After taking the life of a noble, he worked for during a siege on his castle in Ostrheinsburg (he did so in an effort to claim–what he thought was–Soul Edge), he finally managed to come across the legendary weapon Soul Edge, lying beside the corpse of the defeated Cervantes de Leon which transformed into Inferno. Siegfried defeated Inferno, earning the right to wield Soul Edge himself. However, Soul Edge telepathically spoke to Siegfried, arranging a deal between the two; Siegfried would help the blade to restore itself gathering souls, and Soul Edge would resurrect his father Frederick. But Siegfried finally succumbed to the sword's power–transforming into the Azure Knight, Nightmare.

He claimed refuge in Ostrheinsburg Castle. During the following three years, he gathered together a group of followers: the golem Astaroth, Lizardman / Aeon Calcos, and Ivy. Each of them aided him in Soul Edge's quest to devour souls for a rejuvenation ceremony to be performed in his chosen stronghold, Ostrheinsburg Castle. But as the ceremony was about to take place, the clan was quickly laid to waste. Both Aeon Calcos and Astaroth were defeated; and Ivy left the clan after learning the shocking truth of her past from the Japanese ninja Taki. Two young warriors confronted Nightmare: Kilik, owner of both the sacred staff Kali-Yuga and sacred mirror Dvapara-Yuga; and Xianghua, owner of Krita-Yuga, which revealed itself as Soul Calibur.

Nightmare and Soul Edge were defeated, initiating a new resolve in the now-conscious Siegfried, albeit temporary–shards of the weakened Soul Edge were still present within his body. He eventually assumed the azure armor for a second time, becoming Nightmare all over again, desperately pursuing fragments of the Soul Edge so that he might fully restore it. Raphael Sorel appeared in search of Soul Edge and Nightmare stood victorious after a fierce battle. As he stepped forward to finish Raphael, he muttered something incoherently. Following this, an internal struggle began between Siegfried and Inferno (spirit of the evil sword) vying for control over their physical body. With this show of "hesitation", Raphael unleashed a desperate final blow upon his enemy, piercing the center of Soul Edge. Nightmare let out an inhuman cry, and Siegfried finally regained control of his own body. Siegfried remembered his actions previous, before using the newly revealed holy sword, Soul Calibur, to drive into the evil eye that was the core of Soul Edge, where the weapon had been trapped–however, this effort to destroy the evil sword would prove insufficient.

In the preceding event of Soulcalibur III, Siegfried now has control of his own body, picking up both swords and leaving Ostrheinsburg on a mission to seal away Soul Edge for all eternity, as he swore to atone for his sins, not knowing that Nightmare had gained a separate body of his own. Eventually, he fell victim to Zasalamel's plot to reunite Soul Edge and Soul Calibur at the Lost Cathedral. Siegfried took up Soul Calibur and fought a ferocious battle against the now-independent Nightmare, who in turn regained Soul Edge. Though victorious for the time being, the combination of the energy released from Soul Edge and Soul Calibur as well as his injuries from the battle mortally wounded Siegfried.

The events of Soulcalibur IV see Siegfried having been revived by the Soul Calibur, which has gained some sentience from the Soul Edge and the release of its creator, Algol. Now dependent on the armor in which the Soul Calibur had encased him for survival, Siegfried rejects all human contact and devotes himself to destroying both swords once and for all. In his ending, he finally defeats Nightmare decisively and releases the power of the Soul Calibur, permanently sealing away the Soul Edge and Soul Calibur, and killing himself in the process. In Hilde's ending, he is instead forgiven for his crimes as the Azure Knight and given a royal pardon.

One of Siegfried's extra weapons is the Glam (mistranslation of Gram), the weapon that Sigurd in Norse mythology used to kill the dragon Fafnir and in Soulcalibur Legends, Siegfried fights "Fanfir". The Faust blade also takes reference from a German legend, in which the protagonist makes a deal with the Devil (in-universe, Siegfried and Soul Edge have a Faustian bargain).

== Introduced in Soulcalibur ==
=== Arthur ===
Voiced by (English) Dan Woren (SCIII)
Voiced by: Masaya Takatsuka (SCIII)

Arthur (アーサー, Āsā) is a playable character introduced in the first Soulcalibur, where he replaced Mitsurugi in Korea due to the local sensibilities regarding the subject of the samurai. Arthur is an orphaned European who has become a swordsman in Japan. In his first appearance, he looks exactly like Mitsurugi except with blond hair and an eye patch, and his weapon, movelist and ending are identical to Mitsurugi's. Arthur returned as a bonus character in all versions of Soulcalibur III, representing the "Katana" Create-a-Fighter discipline. In this game he is given unique facial characteristics and a weapon of his own, with his outfit based on that of Mitsurugi in Soulcalibur II. Arthur's Destined Battle enemy in Soulcalibur is against Taki (the same as Mitsurugi's), while in Soulcalibur III it is against Mitsurugi.

=== Astaroth ===
Voiced by (English): Jay S. Gilbert (SCII) Michael McConnohie (SCIII & Onwards)
Voiced by: (Japanese): Banjō Ginga (SC); Ryūzaburō Ōtomo (SCII~)

Astaroth (アスタロス, Asutarosu) is a golem created by a cult of Ares to retrieve the cursed sword known as Soul Edge. Upon finding the blade, Astaroth realizes that it is damaged and allies himself with its wielder Nightmare to harvest living souls necessary to restore the blade, planning to steal the blade once completed. However, before he can complete this task, he is confronted by a survivor of his attacks, Maxi, and is slain. Revived by Ares in Soulcalibur II, Astaroth continues after the sword. However, the cult that created him regards this as a betrayal, and places a curse on the golem to dominate him. Astaroth resists and counterattacks the cult, learning in the process his design is not original but instead modeled after a human being, Rock. To assert himself as unique, Astaroth finds and nearly kills Rock at the conclusion of Soulcalibur III, breaking free of Ares' control and transforming in the aftermath. Now hungering for power, he is offered it in return for servitude to Nightmare during the events of Soulcalibur IV, an offer he accepts with the secret goal of devouring Soul Edge itself. Destroyed instead by Maxi, Astaroth's heart is retrieved by the cult responsible for his creation, and a new series of golems all bearing the name "Astaroth" are created from research conducted upon it. Astaroth's story mode in Soulcalibur VI is a retelling of his creation and service to Nightmare, though now he is aided by a ker, sent by Ares to aid him in obtaining Soul Edge.

Soulcalibur IV lead programmer Masaaki Hoshino called Astaroth his favorite character, stating that because he is "so powerful there's always a chance to make a comeback".

=== Edge Master ===
Voiced by (English): TJ Storm (SCV)
Voiced by (Japanese): Daisuke Gōri (SC); Kōji Ishii (SCV)

Edge Master (エッジマスター, Ejji Masutā) has a mysterious past; renowned for his skill with various weapons, his past and real name are known only to himself. He served as advisor and teacher at the Ling-Sheng Su Temple, before it was destroyed by the "Evil Seed" event. Taking in the only survivor of the event, Kilik, he taught him to suppress the evil within himself and sent him to destroy Soul Edge, before departing on a quest of his own. After Soul Edge is shattered by Kilik's companion, Xianghua, he gave her an unnamed Jian and returned to training Kilik in hermitage until Kilik went on his second quest to destroy Soul Edge. Later, he returned to training him when he is carried unconscious by Xianghua (after their fight with Zasalamel) for three months, until he left on his own after receiving a purifying blow from Edge Master and Xianghua's letter. Around this time, he is also challenged by Seong Mi-na, who is swiftly defeated, and trained her for some time upon her request. In the seventeen-year gap between Soulcalibur IV and V, he taught another of Kilik's companion, Maxi to control the Soul Edge's shard in his body and warned him to bequeath Kali-Yuga to Xiba, as Kilik's life is in great danger. Leaving his hermitage a second time, he entered Astral Chaos to prevent the Hero King, Algol from corrupting the world with the realm's energies.

Although not playable in Soulcalibur VI, Edge Master appears in the story mode as Kilik's mentor, Taki's ally in keeping Mitsurugi away from Soul Edge, and a helper to guest character, Geralt of Rivia, in getting the witcher back to his world.

Edge Master was created by illustrator Yasushi Nirasawa, who had designed him as a background character and weapon shop owner for Soul Edge Official Guidebook – Densetsu Buki Tankyū no Sho. Out of appreciation, Namco later introduced him as a playable character in Soulcalibur and a recurring series element. His age is intended to reflect his experience and strength.

=== Kilik ===
Voiced by (English): Scott Reyns (SCII); Grant George (SCIII~)
Voiced by (Japanese): Sōichirō Hoshi

Kilik (キリク, Kiriku) as an infant was left on the steps of a temple in China. He grew up with Xianglian, a fellow monk whom Kilik had seen as his own sister. He was trained in the art of staff-fighting and inherited one of the temple's treasure Kali-Yuga. However, during the night of the "Evil Seed", Kilik and other monks were possessed and fought each other. Xianglian used her inheritance Dvapara-Yuga to stop Kilik, but ended up possessed which forced Kilik to kill her. Sane once more, he came under the tutelage of Edge Master, and joined forces with Maxi and Xianghua (unknowingly Xianglian's sister) to destroy Soul Edge and purge the evil within himself. They confronted Nightmare during his Soul Edge ritual and Kilik managed to defeat him. He returned to hone his skills with Edge Master, but sensed Soul Edge's return four years later that made him travel around the world with Xianghua once again. The two confronted Zasalamel in a corrupted city where Kilik was knocked unconscious by him. He awoke a month later in Edge Master's home and began to train his skills again, determined to search Soul Edge with Xianghua again. While traveling with Xianghua, he realized that he had feelings for her, but he cannot confess it as she reminded him of the late Xianglian, so he planned to leave her when the time is right. During the seventeen-year gap of Soulcalibur IV and Soulcalibur V, the two reunited where Kilik had an intimate meeting with Xianghua that conceived Xiba, but left her before Xiba was born. He then spent his time trying to close the astral gates, where he touched the souls of those who had wandered the Astral Chaos and made him able to learn their styles.

The new timeline not only retells Kilik's tragic past in the Ling-Shang Su temple massacre, but also reveals his malfested form because of the Evil Seed, and his rivalry with new character, Grøh. Throughout his journey with Xianghua and Maxi, Kilik is constantly troubled over Xianglian's death, but is aided by Sophitia, who helps him cope with his past. In the battle against Inferno, Kilik saves Xianghua with control over his malfestation as Grøh did before him, and the pair defeat Inferno.

During Kilik's initial design creation, while the weapon selected remained constant several ages and related appearances were considered. In particular amongst these was suggested a young boy whose design was based upon the legendary Chinese character Sun Wukong, the Monkey King. Other designs such as a feral appearance were considered, but unused due to them feeling "pretty wild" and too different from the initial concept.

=== Lizardman / Aeon Calcos ===
"Lizardman" (リザードマン, Rizādoman) is a recurring enemy type in the Soulcalibur series, resembling bipedal anthropomorphic lizards that communicate through growls and grunts while wielding a short sword and shield. The most notable of which is Aeon Calcos (アイオーン・カルコス, Aiōn Karukosu), one of the warriors sent by the Greek god Hephaestus to destroy Soul Edge. However, he was driven insane when exposed to Soul Edge's energies, and massacred a village that had given him shelter. Captured by a cult, they transformed him and others into Lizardmen; however, the destruction of Soul Edge at the end of Soulcalibur restored his sanity. Despite this his humanity and memories deteriorated, and after being taken in by a group of lizardmen like himself, he now pursues the restored Soul Edge seeking to reclaim his soul. By the time of Soulcalibur V his body has changed further due to battle, now having grown wings and able to breathe fire.

Lizardman was originally conceived as a character meant to complement Sophitia's fighting style, and as a result use the same sword and shield combination as her, although beginning with Soulcalibur III, Aeon Calcos uses an axe and shield combination instead. At one point, Lizardman was meant to be left-handed, but due to various reasons the concept was shelved. In an early character draft, it was considered to have it be a golem protecting a little girl, and would have had bits of its body knocked off during combat. Deciding instead to go with a half-lizard half-man concept, Lizardman's design changed very little afterwards in Soulcalibur, with only one alternative design resembling a more human appearance. Armor was added to his primary design to give him a more defensive appearance, while his secondary costume in Soulcalibur was intended to resemble an iguana.

Lizardmen have appeared throughout the rest of the series as NPCs in various game modes, usually as Guardians.

=== Maxi ===
Voiced by (English): Doug Boyd (SCII); Steve Van Wormer (SCIII~)
Voiced by (Japanese): Nobutoshi Canna (SC~SCIII); Kenjiro Tsuda (SCIV~SCBD); Shigeo Kiyama (SCV~)

Maxi (マキシ, Makishi) was a wandering pirate from Shuri in the Ryūkyū Kingdom (present-day Okinawa, Japan). He fights using nunchaku after learning techniques from "Zhang Wu", an alias for the assassin Li Long. He pursues the golem Astaroth, who attacked his ship and slaughtered his crewmates, joining forces with Kilik and Xianghua. Maxi defeats Astaroth but is critically wounded as a result. He is later found by some villagers who help nurse him back to health using fragments of Soul Edge. He eventually pursues Soul Edge in order to use it to kill Astaroth so he will die, planning to himself die shortly afterward. In Soulcalibur IV, Maxi managed to kill Astaroth, though he had decided not to kill himself and instead went to train with Edge Master to control the shards of Soul Edge in his body, which had stopped his body from aging. After seventeen years, he is sent by Edge Master to bequeath Kali-Yuga to a boy named Xiba, as his friend Kilik's destiny is in great danger. He became a leader of a group consisting of himself, Xiba, Leixia, and Natsu. The group meet Patroklos during his journey and help him restore Soul Calibur back to its full form.

The new timeline goes into further detail on how Maxi loses his crew to Astaroth, and on his journey with Kilik and Xianghua to avenge his brothers. It also reveals Grøh found Maxi injured after the latter's first victory against Astaroth.

After initially considering having Li Long return for Soulcalibur, the development team instead focused on creating a new, younger nunchaku wielder for the title. After considering several ideas for his hairstyle, including several gag designs, the developers initially chose to give him dreadlocks before changing to the current appearance. Additionally, they opted to give him an outfit that would make him attractive.

=== Yoshimitsu ===
Voiced by (English): Phil Sheridan (SCII), Mitch Urban (SCIII)
Voiced by (Japanese): Nobuyuki Hiyama (SC~SCIII), Norio Wakamoto (SCIV~)

Yoshimitsu appears in Namco's Soulcalibur series, starting with 1998's Soulcalibur. After refusing power-hungry lord Oda Nobunaga's offer of alliance, Yoshimitsu discovers his village has been destroyed. In a battle with Nobunaga's army, Yoshimitsu loses his arm. He subsequently sets out to find the fabled weapon Soul Edge in order to have revenge against Nobunaga. In meditation, Yoshimitsu decides that if he were to give in to his hatred, he would be no better than Nobunaga or Nightmare. When he reaches the castle where Soul Edge is, he discovers it has been locked away with Soul Calibur.

In the Soulcalibur series, Yoshimitsu uses his beloved self-named katana and the Manji ninjutsu combat style, handed down through many generations in the Manji Clan. His weapon seems like a normal katana, but it has many unique features that accommodate the unique fighting style of the Manji. Since it was forged with secret Manji techniques, it cannot be replicated and is the last of its kind. After the massacre of his clan, Yoshimitsu swears an oath of vengeance to the weapon. He also uses the sashimono on his back as a striking weapon. In Soulcalibur II, Yoshimitsu discovers that his katana has been impregnated with corrupted energy from the castle, and so resolves to rid his blade of the evil. The katana was stolen by Voldo when Yoshimitsu was worn out from trying to fight its corruption. Fearing what would happen if the weapon wound up in the wrong hands, Yoshimitsu sets out to retrieve the katana, and in the process discovers a fragment of the Soul Edge. Wanting to destroy the fragments spread across the earth, Yoshimitsu forms a band of chivalrous thieves, known as the Manjitou, in order to do good and to find the remaining fragments.

Yoshimitsu returns in Soulcalibur III, in which he plans a robbery in order to steal a fragment of the Soul Edge. The robbery fails as Tira, a servant of Soul Edge and Nightmare, ambushes the thieves and takes the fragment. Later on, Tira murders one of his clan members, causing Yoshimitsu to seek her for revenge in Soulcalibur IV. By the time of Soulcalibur V, the first Yoshimitsu has been ritually executed and succeeded by a younger, eerily similar protégé (hailing from Taki's Fûma village), who shares his fighting style, voice, mannerisms, and his clockwork arm. This secret line of succession makes "Yoshimitsu" appear immortal to outsiders and is implied to continue into modern times with the Tekken incarnation of the character.

The original Yoshimitsu returns again in Soulcalibur VI, where he seeks to obtain Soul Edge to avenge his slain clan members. But after an encounter with Sophitia, Yoshimitsu fights back against his possessed sword and swears to create a band of righteous thieves to help the poor.

== Introduced in Soulcalibur II ==
In addition to the characters below, lesser storyline related characters were included in console versions of the title as unlockable characters, appearing as recurring enemies in the game's "Weapon Master Mode". Assassin and Berserker served as counterparts to previous characters Hwang and Rock. Both would later appear as boss enemies in Soulcalibur III, with Assassin's fighting style modified to utilize a kunai and Berserker modified into a smaller, fully armored warrior armed with a lance. Several generic Lizardmen also appear as recurring enemies and an unlockable character.

=== Cassandra ===
Voiced by (English): Debbie Rogers (SCII); Sue Nelson (SCIII) Heather Halley (SCIV to SCVI)
Voiced by (Japanese): Reiko Takagi

Cassandra Alexandra (カサンドラ・アレクサンドル, Kasandora Arekusandoru) was the younger daughter and middle child of Achelous Alexander and his wife, Nike. She had an older sister, Sophitia, and a younger brother, Lucius, with whom she ran the family bakery in Athens. In Soul Edge, she was mentioned as having witnessed her sister's unconscious body being carried by female ninja Taki after the two successfully destroyed the cursed sword Soul Edge. Taki shared to her the information about a Soul Edge fragment that was lodged near her sister's heart, which Taki was unable to remove because it would kill her. Cassandra resolved never to tell anyone about this, even Sophitia herself. Three years later, she heard her sister had gone to another journey to destroy Soul Edge in Soulcalibur. Unlike her sister, whose skills originated from her weapons and the god Hephaestus, Cassandra was not as humble and could not hear him, relying instead on her own strength.

By the time of Soulcalibur II four years afterward, the 21-years-old Cassandra visited her sister's home to find that Sophitia's children Patroklos and Pyrrha were fighting for a fragment of Soul Edge that Sophitia's husband, Rothion, found, making Sophitia restless. She grabbed the fragment and went to the Eurydice Shrine, angrily cursing Hephaestus for endangering her sister. Cassandra stole Sophitia's holy Omega sword after seeing it reacting with the fragment and became determined to find and destroy Soul Edge in place of Sophitia.

Cassandra continued her quest to find Soul Edge in Soulcalibur III. She briefly returned to Greece to request Rothion to forge her new weapons after the Omega sword was broken following a skirmish at a corrupted city. He told her that Sophitia had gone to destroy Soul Edge on her own. She visited the city that she went earlier, where she met a man named Raphael who stole her fragment of Soul Edge. Before departing, he told that while she had the power to dispel evil, she was not as strong as the "Holy Stone". After hearing rumors in the city about a man with a large mass of crystal on his way to Ostrheinsburg Castle, Cassandra reasoned he carried the Holy Stone to fight some evil there, which she theorized was Soul Edge. Therefore, Cassandra went to the castle.

Cassandra did not make an appearance in Soulcalibur V, although she was mentioned in the official artbook of the game. According to the artbook, at the conclusion of Soulcalibur IV, she arrived at the Ostrheinsburg Castle and found out that Sophitia had pledged her service to Soul Edge to save Pyrrha, who spent too much time around Soul Edge and had to rely on the sword to survive. Sophitia rendered Cassandra unconscious with a single strike, wounding her greatly. When she awakened, she found that the entire castle was disintegrating into a realm called Astral Chaos. Now weakened, Cassandra found Sophitia's unconscious body in a room, but as she approached her, Cassandra was sucked to the Astral Chaos while the castle returned to normal, as she was too wounded to escape. Due to being stranded in the Astral Chaos, Cassandra became malfested, losing the memories of her own original identity, and keeping only her desire to save her sister.

In the new timeline of Soulcalibur VI, Cassandra ran the family bakery alongside Lucius while trying to cover for Sophitia's absence. She encountered her future self from the original timeline and found out her sister's tragic fate. As a result of this revelation, Cassandra set off on a journey to prevent Sophitia's tragic future. After the wedding between Rothion and Sophitia, Cassandra was tasked with naming their first child.

Outside of the main series, Cassandra appeared in Soulcalibur: Broken Destiny's Gauntlet storyline, a non-canon side story set during the events of Soulcalibur IV, which revolved around Cassandra and her ally Hilde, who was searching for ingredients to develop a potion to cure Hilde's father. To this end, she forced the protagonist to assist them, and later recruited another person, Dampierre, after Hilde was briefly kidnapped.

Cassandra also starred as one of the two main characters (and the one most prominently used for promotion) in the mobile card game Soulcalibur: Unbreakable Soul, alongside Edge Master. In it, Cassandra and Edge Master traveled to find the fragments of Soul Edge.

Besides the Soulcalibur series, Cassandra appeared in the video game Smash Court Tennis Pro Tournament 2 as an unlockable character. To explain the new features of Soulcalibur IV, Namco released an omake manga featuring Cassandra and Hilde; written in a humorous tone, Cassandra, representing a veteran of the series, "taught" Hilde about the game's features, while introducing the audience to aspects of Hilde's character. Cassandra appeared in The King of Fighters All Star in both her Soulcalibur VI design, and her "War Maiden" costume from Soulcalibur IV. She is the main protagonist of the story mode, "In the Hopeful Future", where she teamed up with Nakoruru from Samurai Shodown to defeat Saiki, the main antagonist of The King of Fighters XIII.

=== Charade ===
Charade (シャレード, Sharēdo) is the name of a creature introduced in Soulcalibur II, formed from Soul Edge's fragments and various reshaped human body parts. It has no intellect, instead acting on instinct and a desire to absorb other pieces of Soul Edge. It was once a man who collected fragments of Soul Edge but was murdered and in his final moments had him mutated into Charade. It mimics fighting styles and weapons by scanning the minds of its opponents, represented in Soulcalibur II by his use of a random fighting style from one of the other game's characters. In the arcade version of Soulcalibur II, Charade served as the final boss, and was unlocked for players to use after the game had been in operation a certain amount of time. For console ports of the title, Charade was replaced by Inferno as the game's final boss, and was made into a regular unlockable character. A Charade appears as a boss in Soulcalibur III in a three-round match in which it progressively loses components of itself between each round, eventually reduced to just its eye. It presumably became one with Soul Edge/Nightmare.

Charades appear in the game Namco × Capcom as enemy characters, mimicking Sophitia's fighting style from Soulcalibur II. These Charades are unique in that Soul Edge creates them directly, an ability it lacks in the Soul series. Called Soul Edge's "avatars" by the game's protagonists, they are created by Soul Edge as foot soldiers and as a means to protect itself. When defeated, they will melt and dissolve into nothing.

Reception to Charade has been mixed. Netjack's Steve Lubitz described Charade as "Weapon Master, only uglier" and cited a lack of creativity with the design. The sentiment was shared by Deeko's review of Soulcalibur II, who said that Charade felt like a new character that used "old character moves and tactics". Other reviewers of II repeated the sentiment, noting Charade as one of several "Doppelgänger" fighters in the title that filled in another character's role. On the other hand, UGO's Doug Trueman cited Charade as a character that "[added] something spectacular to the Soul Calibur pantheon." and additionally received mention in UGO's "Top 11 Soul Calibur Fighters" article, losing to Olcadan only due to Olcadan's owl-inspired design.

=== Yun-Seong ===
Voiced by (English): Jim Singer (SCII) Michael Reisz (SCIII to SC:BD)
Voiced by (Japanese): Kōsuke Toriumi

Hong Yun-Seong (ホン・ユンスン, Hon Yunsun) was introduced in Soulcalibur II as a student at the Seong dojo and had idolized Hwang Seong-gyeong, a Korean warrior sent to find the "Sword of Salvation". When Hwang rejected his attempt to challenge him, the dojo's daughter Seong Mi-na handed Yun-seong the White Storm, a dao capable of reflecting the user's inner thoughts. He decided to leave his dojo in search of the "Sword of Salvation". During his journey, he met a group of deserted children whose leader is sick as well as a teenager named Talim, who warned him about the dangers of the sword he search, revealed to be Soul Edge. After he helped Talim performing the cleansing ritual on the sick boy, Yun-seong pursued Talim who left swiftly to find the sword and continued their journey together. They met Mi-na who attempted to persuade Yun-seong to go home, but he refused and left the two during their sleep one night. He eventually arrived at Ostrheinsburg and encountered his idol Hwang, again warning Yun-seong about the sword's evil nature, though it did not stop him and went about his quest anyway, parting his ways with Hwang. He does not appear in Soulcalibur V, but is mentioned in the game's artbook, where he is stated to have returned to his homeland after Soulcalibur IV, deemed a national hero, and began teaching the young generation alongside Hwang and Seong Mi-na.

=== Raphael ===
Voiced by (English): Paul Jennings (SCII) Charles Klausmeyer (SCIII to SCVI)
Voiced by (Japanese): Yasunori Masutani

Raphael Sorel (ラファエル・ソレル, Rafaeru Soreru) is a French nobleman, exiled by his family for committing a grievance against them. Hidden from his pursuers by a young girl named Amy, he took her in as his adoptive daughter and sought Soul Edge to secure a future for both of them. He was utterly defeated in battle with Nightmare, the sword's wielder, though he managed to stab the sword, which helped Siegfried wrest his mind from its influence. Raphael and Amy contracted vampirism as a result of Soul Edge's power resonating in wounds from the battle, and the two relocated to a castle in Romania, where their vampirism led to infection among the local peasantry. However, the populace began to be healed one by one by a "Holy Stone". Feeling threatened, Raphael decided to leave the castle to find and destroy the stone. During his journey, he learned from the "creatures of the dark" that the Holy Stone was Soul Edge's counterpart Soul Calibur, which had even greater power than Soul Edge, and decided to find and use the sword to create a "perfect world" for himself and Amy. After the events of Soulcalibur IV, Raphael is stated to have died, but suddenly awoke in a dungeon cell seventeen years later with no memory of what happened and found that Amy had disappeared from his life. Determined to finish his plan, he began his search for Amy. It is heavily implied by the official artbook that Raphael has become the new vessel of Nightmare after his destruction; this is further supported by the fact that Nightmare uses Raphael's body model in the Create-A-Soul mode as well as them sharing the same voice actor in Japanese as of Soulcalibur V, therefore making Raphael the identity of "Graf Dumas".

In the new timeline of Soulcalibur VI, after his adoption of Amy and further confirm his "Graf Dumas" status, Raphael comes across a couple of secret documents by a mysterious scholar, later revealed to be new character, Azwel. With his plan for a perfect world for Amy using Soul Edge, Raphael is easily manipulated by Azwel into finding the cursed sword. It also reveals in a possible timeline where he never met Amy, Raphael would become a mindless malfested.

Raphael's appearance in Soulcalibur III was changed heavily, designed to represent his evil demeanor and royal image. The chief character designer of the game, Hideo Yoshie, stated that the change made Raphael "more distinctive".

He also appeared in Smash Court Tennis Pro Tournament 2 as an unlockable character.

== Introduced in Soulcalibur III ==
In addition to the characters below, several others appear within the game under the title of "bonus" characters, representing fighting styles exclusive to the game's character creation mode as unlockable characters. These include minor storyline characters such as Amy and Revenant, others from previous installments otherwise absent from the game such as Arthur, Li Long and Hwang, and characters exclusive to the game's "Chronicles of the Sword" mode. Amy would later be fleshed out into a full character in Soulcalibur IV. In addition, the game features a final boss character called "Night Terror" that can be fought once specific conditions have been met.

=== Amy/Viola ===
Voiced by (English): Heather Hogan
Voiced by (Japanese): Kanako Tateno (SCIII); Hitomi Nabatame (SCIV~onwards)

Amy (エイミ, Eimi) was initially introduced as a background character for Raphael, as a young girl who hid him from his pursuers and taken in as his foster daughter in a debt of gratitude. To secure a future for her, he left Amy behind to pursue the cursed sword Soul Edge, with plans to present it to the nobles that pursued him so they would be overtaken by its curse and destroy each other. However, he was utterly defeated by its host, and as Amy tended to his wounds both of them were infected with vampirism. They traveled to a castle in Romania, and he left her to ensure the creation of an ideal world for both of them. Amy, however, felt abandoned, and set out on her own to protect their world herself.

After the seventeen-year gap between Soulcalibur IV and Soulcalibur V, Amy has mysteriously disappeared, initiating Raphael's search for her. In reality, Amy has resurfaced and grown-up in the said fifth game as an amnesiac fortune-teller named Viola (ヴィオラ, Viora), losing most of her memories and life. Amy, now Viola begin live as a wanderer because of her inability to empathize with other peoples, until she met Z.W.E.I. The two then become traveling companions. Eventually, they are found by Siegfried, the leader of reformed Schwarzwind and took them as fugitives/mercenaries. She then assists Patroklos to find Soul Calibur under orders from Siegfried, along with Z.W.E.I., though he leaves after finding his sister, Pyrrha. It is revealed in Soulcalibur VI that Amy's transformation into an amnesiac Viola was because of Azwel's magic.

Like Raphael, Amy wields a rapier as her weapon. In her debut appearance, Amy utilizes the "Rapier" custom fighting style closely based on Raphael's moveset. In the arcade version of Soulcalibur III, she is more divergent, having moves that focused more on speed than power, unlike Raphael; this change is retained in Soulcalibur IV. First seen in Soulcalibur II opening sequence, Amy's character model was reused with a modified design in Soulcalibur III as a debug character for the developers to test elements of the game with and against, also appearing in some of the game's epilogue sequences. After completion of most of the game, they decided to implement her as a full character as a result of liking her design. When she was announced as a playable character in the sequel for Soulcalibur IV, game director Daishi Odashima stating the reason behind her inclusion as "I like weaker characters", noting her as one of his three favorite characters in the game.

As Viola, her weapons are a metal claw and a magical crystal ball which floats around during battles. Prior both Amy and Viola revealed to be a same person as of SCVI, there were numerous hints, such as having the same looks, in-game interactions with Raphael, as well as her sharing the same voice actress in both English and Japanese, allude to their connections.

=== Night Terror ===
Night Terror (ナイトテラー, Naito Terā) is the secret final boss of Soulcalibur III, replacing the normal final boss Abyss if certain requirements are met. Its appearance has been a mystery as it is not player-controllable, is given very little mention in-game (its profile only stated that it is the result of Soul Edge and Soul Calibur fusing with Nightmare's remains), and does not appear nor is it mentioned in future games. The official artbook of Soulcalibur V mentions the creature as the personification of "Catastrophe" residing in Astral Chaos who is so powerful that even Soul Calibur's creator, Algol, avoids confronting it.

Night Terror utilizes a complete version of Soul Edge as its weapon with a fighting style simply referred to as "Memories of Nightmare?". It borrows many moves from Nightmare, albeit greatly amplified, including having greater range and power or becoming unblockable. Notably, Night Terror is the only character in the history of the series who cannot be defeated by ring outs; whenever it is knocked off the stage, it simply flies back using its wings.

=== Olcadan ===
Voiced by (English): David Jeremiah
Voiced by (Japanese): Shigenori Sōya

Olcadan (オルカダン, Orukadan) was introduced in Soulcalibur III as a warrior that mastered a variety of martial arts and weapon usage and interested in honing his skills. When he reached adulthood only one of his fights had ended in a draw, so to test himself he hunted down God of War Ares's messenger, a great snow owl and decapitated it as proof of his victory. He was cursed as a result with an owl's head depending on the position of the stars and was later imprisoned in a labyrinth where time stood still. When the seal was eventually broken, he learned of Soul Edge's power and, impressed, he sought to defeat it. During this time he also learned of currency and growing fond of it he served as an instructor to other warriors for payment.

He received positive reception as a character due to his appearance and demeanor, placing in UGO.com's Top 11 SoulCalibur Fighters article at eleventh place, beating out fellow series mimic character Charade. They additionally awarded the character "Best New Character" of 2005 and proposed the possibility of Olcadan appearing in a stand-alone title and serving as a mascot for Namco, drawing comparisons to characters such as Master Chief. The character was additionally mentioned by them in their early coverage of Soulcalibur IV, noting hope for his return in the title.

=== Setsuka ===
Voiced by (English): Kari Wahlgren (SCIII); Tara Platt (SCIV~)
Voiced by (Japanese): Nanaho Katsuragi (SCIII~SCBD); Yō Taichi (SCVI~)

Setsuka (雪華) is a character introduced in Soulcalibur III. An orphan and runaway living in Japan, she was shunned due to her Caucasian ancestry. Eventually, she was taken in by Shugen Kokonoe, a man who worked as a bodyguard in the region. He named her Setsuka ("Snow Flower"). He taught her his fighting style, as well as showing her affection and kindness, things she had never experienced before, and gave her a beautiful, ornate kimono. After he dies from wounds sustained in combat with Mitsurugi, Setsuka realized she had fallen in love with the man. Despite his dying request not to pursue revenge she chooses to do so. She now tracks Nightmare, believing it will lead her to Mitsurugi, who himself pursues Nightmare. She continues on her search for Mitsurugi in Soulcalibur IV. She is given no mention in Soulcalibur V, although she appears briefly in the official artbook of the game, where she shattered Mitsurugi's sword in a duel but lost the battle, took the name "Neve" and began to teach students her fighting style in Istanbul, one of which was Patroklos. She told him not to pursue revenge as she had before, though he ultimately ignored the advice in his search for Pyrrha.

She returns in Soulcalibur VI as a DLC character. The new timeline gives further details on her close relationship with Shugen and how she came to lose him, as well as her birth heritage as a Portuguese-Japanese. Although she initially listens to her master's request not to avenge him, Setsuka decides to pursues Mitsurugi after a fight with the mysterious Kokonoe clan over hidden scrolls with secret advanced fighting techniques, and eventually leads her to be involved with Soul Edge-related incidents.

Character developer Hideo Yoshie stated that Setsuka's concept originated from the idea of a flower. Her outfit in Soulcalibur III was inspired by historical Japanese courtesans known as oiran, who wore cosmetics and clothing similar to a geisha's but tied their obi at the front instead of behind, mixed with elements from the Queen of Hearts as part of an "East-meets-West" concept.

=== Tira ===
Voiced by (English): Alison Lees-Taylor (SCIII to SCV), Kate Higgins (SCVI)
Voiced by (Japanese): Masumi Asano

Tira (ティラ) first appeared in Soulcalibur III as an assassin that fled her previous group due to her mental instability. Though she attempted a peaceful life in a quiet city, she eventually found her urge to kill uncontrollable and wandered until she learned of the living sword Soul Edge and its wielder, Nightmare. Sensing a kindred spirit, she pledged her loyalty to the sword, and sought both a new host for Soul Edge and to destroy its antithesis, the sword Soul Calibur. At the story's climax, the energy released by Soul Edge and Soul Calibur clashing caused her personality to split into two extremes, Jolly and Gloomy. When Soul Edge returned in Soulcalibur IV, she resumed her service to him, manipulating others into helping, such as Sophitia by kidnapping her daughter, Pyrrha.

In Soulcalibur V, set 17 years after the events of IV, both Nightmare and Soul Edge had resurfaced after being destroyed at the end of IV, the former possessing a swordsman ruling Hungary. Disapproving the current state of her master, Tira intended to use Pyrrha as a new vessel of Soul Edge by manipulating the latter's isolation and earlier exposure to Soul Edge. However, she was confronted by Pyrrha's younger brother, Patroklos. Defeated, she escaped Patroklos' wrath and left Pyrrha with him, but later convinced Pyrrha to follow her again when Patroklos was reluctant to accept her state. A more mature-looking Tira returns in Soulcalibur VI. In this game, she has very little empathy on humans and enjoys killing people, treating it like a hobby.

Hyper magazine described her as Soulcalibur III's "obligatory weird chick", adding that "she's supposed to be an angel of death, but looks like an oversexed court jester to us." However, they praised her animation and gameplay, calling them mesmerizing unlike those of other characters, adding "imagine a homicidal rhythm gymnast and you're on the right track." Electronic Gaming Monthly describes Tira as a "Cirque du Soleil reject", though added she is "modestly endowed, but highly flexible." IGN included her in their "Babes of Soulcalibur" article, stating "She immediately stands out (...) Whereas most of the SC women fight on the side of good, Tira is totally, deliciously evil." They also praised her outfits, calling them some of the best in the Soul series.

=== Zasalamel ===
Voiced by (English): Keith Silverstein
Voiced by (Japanese): Hiroshi Tsuchida

Zasalamel (ザサラメール, Zasaramēru) hails from an ancient tribe that was tasked with the protection of the holy sword Soul Calibur by Algol. Angered by the tribe's restrictions, he tried to take Soul Calibur but was caught and exiled. Pursuing the sword he gained the ability to reincarnate, though eventually yearned to die for good. Tracking down Soul Edge, he manipulated events so that Soul Calibur would come to him, serving as the main antagonist of Soulcalibur III. Hoping to use the combined energies of the swords to end his existence, he was instead transformed into a monster called Abyss. During these events he had a vision of the future, and desiring to see it firsthand he returned to life, acting in Soulcalibur IV to protect the swords in case their destruction broke his cycle of reincarnation. His further fate afterward is unknown, as he is given no mention in Soulcalibur V.

Zasalamel reappears in the new timeline of Soulcalibur VI, which revisits the events of the first Soulcalibur game, as a foreseer of the future.

Zasalamel was positively received. Official U.S. PlayStation Magazine described Zasalamel as "easily the coolest" of the three new characters introduced in Soulcalibur III, noting his speed and ability to pull opponents to him. Other reviewers have shared the sentiments, praising his accessibility for new players. GameSpy went further to describe him as one of the best characters in Soulcalibur III, noting his offensive abilities and range control.

== Introduced in Soulcalibur IV and Broken Destiny ==
In addition to these characters, with Soulcalibur IV several manga and anime character designers were invited to contribute additional, non-canon characters to the game: Angol Fear (voiced by Takako Honda in Japanese), a female alien designed by Mine Yoshizaki and cousin of his existing character Angol Mois; Ashlotte (voiced by Hitomi Nabatame in Japanese), a mechanical doll developed by Oh! great sent to destroy series character Astaroth; Kamikirimusi (voiced by Nami Kurokawa in Japanese), a young female oni designed by Hirokazu Hisayuki searching for kindred spirits; Scheherazade (voiced by Nami Kurokawa in Japanese), an elven storyteller designed by Yutaka Izubuchi and based on the Persian queen of the same name; and Shura (voiced by Takako Honda in Japanese), a possessed female warrior designed by Hiroya Oku. Rather than having a unique fighting style, each was modeled after an existing character: Seong Mi-na, Astaroth, Nightmare, Amy, and Cervantes, respectively. Of these characters, only Ashlotte and Scheherazade are referenced in later games; the former being alluded to in Astaroth's Soulcalibur V's profile information, and the latter being alluded to in one of the background texts explaining the founding of the Wolfkrone Kingdom in Soulcalibur VI.

=== Algol ===
Voiced by (English): Jamieson Price
Voiced by (Japanese): Jōji Nakata

Algol (アルゴル, Arugoru) serves as the Story Mode boss for most characters and as an unlockable character in Soulcalibur IV. Prior to the events of Soul Edge, Algol was known as "The Hero King", able to use the cursed sword Soul Edge without being controlled by it. He used it to forge an era of peace, until his son was possessed by the sword and Algol was forced to destroy them both. He worked to create a purified sword from a shard of Soul Edge to counter the weapon when it reappeared, resulting in the creation of Soul Calibur but with his body and soul trapped inside until the two swords clashed. Freed, he constructed himself a new body armed with facsimiles of both swords, and waited for them to come to him so that he could make his revival permanent. After the events of Soulcalibur IV, Algol had been working to corrupt the world with energies from Astral Chaos in order to control it. His actions had caused much disturbance of the world, with Edge Master even entering Astral Chaos to prevent him.

Character designer Hideo Yoshie described Algol as "a character that obviously proves the setting of being the strongest character ever in the Soulcalibur series". Algol's costume was designed around the concept of originating from a culture so ancient that it was not recorded in history, which complicated the character's creation. After considering several themes including a lion and a dinosaur, a bird motif was finally settled upon. An option was considered for Algol to cause an "off site brawl" while on a pipe chair, but was unused. His design elements including his projectile-firing "rifle arm" were called fresh and innovative by Gameswelt. The staff of 1UP.com were particularly impressed by his rifle attack, nicknaming the projectiles "Soul Bubbles" in reference to a game by the same name. Kotaku also praised the character, describing him as "much more of a bad ass" than recurring series boss Inferno. Edge described him as breaking the tradition of "ill-balanced uber-enemies" as well as one able to use a gun as a weapon without seeming "hopelessly out of place" in the series. GameAxis Unwired praised the character for breaking the series' tradition of bosses that mimicked existing fighting styles, and added that Algol remained for the most part fair to fight against. Neoseeker stated that Algol felt as if he was "just there, purely for your entertainment", calling his fighting style bizarre but while frustrating to fight, beatable.

=== Dampierre ===
Voiced by (English): Troy Baker
Voiced by (Japanese): Shigeru Chiba

Geo Dampierre (ジオ・ダンピエール, Jio Danpiēru) is a con artist introduced in Soulcalibur: Broken Destiny and known by a variety of titles, amongst which include "Alchemist of the Ages", "The World's Greatest Assassin", and "Miraculous Psychic". He eventually became recognized as a thief, and resorted to robbery and kidnapping to continue his rich lifestyle. Desiring to live a noble life instead, he decides to fight against Nightmare and use his skills for good. In Soulcalibur V, he had heard about the new king of Hungary, Graf Dumas (actually Nightmare in disguise) had prepared for wars, so Dampierre arranges a meeting with him. His weapons consist of two spring mounted daggers strapped to the underside of his wrists. He is voiced by Shigeru Chiba in Japanese, who the developers felt gave the character a distinct voice.

Dampierre's introduction in the game was the result of the amount of unused character and weapon designs that were excluded from Soulcalibur IV, and the team's desire to instead focus on creating a character based around their personality instead. Though the development team had mixed feelings regarding the character, they chose to take a risk and add him to Broken Destiny regardless.

=== Hilde ===
Voiced by (English): Julie Ann Taylor
Voiced by (Japanese): Yūko Kaida

Hildegard von Krone (ヒルデガルド・フォン・クローネ, Hirudegarudo fon Kurōne) — simply known as Hilde (ヒルダ, Hiruda) — is the daughter of the king of Wolfkrone, a fictional European kingdom under assault by series antagonist Nightmare's forces. After her father was driven insane into a Malfested by the Evil Seed event brought upon by the cursed sword Soul Edge (which took place seven years before the events of Soulcalibur IV), Hilde was forced to take the throne of Wolfkrone despite her young age. She took the responsibilities to protect her people and lead her armies in the front lines against Nightmare. As a desperate measure, Hilde seeks the Sword of Resurrection, Soul Calibur, to bring back an ancient king who once restored peace to the world. She returns in Soulcalibur VI as the first DLC fighter of the 2nd season pass. In the new timeline, the mysterious Aval Organization where the new character Grøh belongs to had been a sworn allied force to Hilde's home kingdom for generations. In Soulcalibur: Broken Destiny's Gauntlet storyline, a non-canon side story set after the events of Soulcalibur IV, the plot revolves around Hilde and her ally Cassandra, who search for ingredients to develop a potion to cure Hilde's father. To this end they force the protagonist to assist them, and later recruit another person, Dampierre, after Hilde is briefly kidnapped.

To explain the new features of Soulcalibur IV, Namco released an omake manga featuring Hilde and Cassandra. Written in a humorous tone, Cassandra, representing a veteran of the series, "taught" Hilde about the game's features, while introducing the audience to aspects of Hilde's character. Hilde was featured in a promotional comic bundled with the North American release of Soulcalibur IV's Premium Edition. Drawn by Udon Entertainment for DC Comics, it served as a prelude to the events of the game.

IGN cited her as a fierce opponent and "hell of a lot of fun to control", adding "...we tend to sit up and take notice when a new character shows promise...we expect she'll stick around for the long haul." Additional praise was given in their review of Soulcalibur IV, stating an approval of her design combined with her personality, and a preference for her over the game's unlockable characters. Topless Robot named her one of the "11 Most Dignified Videogame Heroines", stating "For Soulcalibur IV's cast, the developers at Namco went out of their way to add one woman who wasn't spilling out of a tight, scant outfit, perhaps to excuse the fact that about every other female character is." Neoseeker praised her design, calling her the "most modest female character in Soulcalibur, looking at her unbelievably awesome outfit -- a full suit of armor with helmet included. No skin? No problem!"

== Introduced in Soulcalibur V ==
=== Elysium ===
Voiced by (English): Catherine Taber
Voiced by (Japanese): Chie Nakamura

Elysium (エリュシオン, Eryushion) is the physical manifestation of Soul Calibur, taking the form of an angelic woman who, due to Patroklos's influence, resembles Sophitia. Her goal is to destroy everything related to Soul Edge and will do anything to achieve it, even if it means destroying the innocent "malfested". She guides Patroklos to destroy Soul Edge using Soul Calibur with the promise that she will help him find his sister Pyrrha, though she already knows that Pyrrha is a malfested and must be vanquished. She is successful in convincing Patroklos to kill Pyrrha, though Edge Master's giving of a second chance prevents Patroklos from doing so. Angry, she traps Patroklos in a crystal and confronts him in his subconscious to reveal her intentions and tries to possess Patroklos in order to destroy Soul Edge, though in the end she is defeated and eventually destroyed by Patroklos and Pyrrha along with Soul Calibur.

Along with Edge Master and Kilik, she is a mimic character in Soulcalibur V, mimicking the styles of female characters. Uniquely, she has a few unique moves when she mimics Pyrrha Omega, which are actually Sophitia's moves, and has a different Critical Edge unlike other mimic characters.

=== Leixia ===
Voiced by (English): Lauren Landa
Voiced by (Japanese): Yoshino Nanjō

Yan Leixia (イェン・レイシャ, Yen Reisha) is the daughter of Xianghua and a Chinese general whom she married after parting ways with Kilik. She was trained in the arts of Chinese swordplay using a Jian by her mother. During her fifteenth birthday, she was given a collar containing a shard of Kilik's anti-evil mirror, Dvapara-Yuga, by her younger brother, Leixin, as a present. When she showed it to her mother, Xianghua grew frantic and planned to have Leixia marry a Chinese general, troubling Leixia who decided to leave her home to learn why her mother had reacted to the sight of the pendant. Befriending the ninja Natsu, they joined Maxi and Xiba in traveling the world.

According to the game's official artbook, SOULCALIBUR – New Legends of Project Soul, Xiba, one of Leixia's travel companion is actually her estranged older half-brother, the result of her mother's intimate meeting with Kilik. The reason why Xianghua had gone frantic at the sight of Dvapara-Yuga and decided to arrange Leixia's marriage with a general is because the pendant reminded her of Kilik and Xianghua does not want her daughter to have an illegal affair like the former had with Kilik.

=== Natsu ===
Voiced by (English): Kate Higgins
Voiced by (Japanese): Fuyuka Oura

Natsu (ナツ; also written as 凪津) is a young ninja and the disciple of Taki. She wields two ninjatō and harbors the demon Arahabaki (荒吐鬼) inside her, who was sealed by Taki after his previous container was killed. Because of this, she was treated as an outcast by her community and was very shy as a young girl, though she eventually grew her confidence with the help of Taki. After Taki failed to return from a mission, promising to return within two weeks, Natsu grew worried, and after Leixia arrived at Fu-Ma village gates, she became a bodyguard to Leixia, hoping she could find her beloved master along the way.

Natsu also appears in Project X Zone 2 as a playable solo unit.

=== Patroklos ===
Voiced by (English): Yuri Lowenthal
Voiced by (Japanese): KENN

Patroklos Alexandra (パトロクロス・アレクサンドル, Patorokurosu Arekusandoru) is the main protagonist of Soulcalibur V. He is Sophitia's son, and uses a short sword and a shield like his mother, though his alternate version, α Patroklos (アルファ・パトロクロス, Arufa Patorokurosu) hides his true fighting style: an iaido swordplay, taught to him by Setsuka after his father's death. Patroklos' sister, Pyrrha, was abducted by Tira when he was only two years old. His mother, Sophitia left their home in search for her, but she never returned. His father, Rothion had tried to search for her and simultaneously kept the truth from the family until seventeen years later, when he caught an unexplainable sickness. Before his death, he told Patroklos everything about their family. Patroklos left his home in search for Pyrrha and eventually become a slayer of malfested under the order of Graf Dumas, the king of Hungary. However, his meeting with Z.W.E.I. severs his ties with the king upon learning he has been manipulated. Under the guidance of a mysterious voice from Soul Calibur (which is Elysium), he continues his duty on killing the malfested. He is eventually reunited with his sister, but has difficulty accepting her as a malfested. After killing her during a duel, he receives words of advice from Edge Master in Astral Chaos, while also rekindling his true fighting style. Patroklos returns to an earlier point in time, and is given a second chance to save Pyrrha. He is able to do so, but is confronted by Elysium who tries to possess Patroklos, though he manages to defeat her and seals Soul Calibur with Soul Edge, after which he is able to accept Pyrrha and lives on with her.

Fan reception to Patroklos has been significantly negative, with the majority condemning him as the series' "Most Hated Character."

=== Pyrrha ===
Voiced by (English): Laura Bailey
Voiced by (Japanese): Nozomi Sasaki

Pyrrha Alexandra (ピュラ・アレクサンドル, Pyura Arekusandoru) is Patroklos' sister and Sophitia's daughter who uses her mother's sword and shield which were made by her father, Rothion. Pyrrha was kidnapped by Tira when she was only three years old in order to torment Sophitia. She knows nothing about her past, other than the fact that everyone that was close to her strangely died, which earns her the title "Bringer of Woe". She was imprisoned after being accused of killing a nobleman's son who purchased her from a slave market. It was that time Tira appears and took care of her. However, her only reason on doing that is to make Pyrrha a new vessel for Soul Edge since she already knew that Pyrrha's body contained parts of Soul Edge's power. To charge up the demonic powers, Tira orders Pyrrha to kill people, promising her that she will take Pyrrha to reunite with her long lost brother, Patroklos. The two eventually reunite, but the influence of the Soul Edge manages to corrupt her, turning her into Pyrrha Ω (ピュラ・オメガ, Pyura Omega), with a deformed arm much like Nightmare's and wielding Soul Edge as a sword and shield like her mother did. Patroklos is unable to accept her form and later kills her during a duel. With the aid of Edge Master within Astral Chaos, he is able to go back in time, and alter the past event, granting himself a second chance. Patroklos prevails against Pyrrha in battle, and disarms her; therefore freeing her from Soul Edge's control. After Patroklos' final confrontation with Elysium, Pyrrha pierces Soul Calibur with Soul Edge and returns home, having been accepted by Patroklos.

Outside of the series, Pyrrha is the main character of Queen's Gate: Pyrrha (蒼運命に翻弄される娘 ピュラ), an erotic gamebook as part of the Queen's Gate series.

=== Xiba ===
Voiced by (English): Johnny Yong Bosch
Voiced by (Japanese): Toshiyuki Toyonaga

Xiba (シバ, Shiba) is described as an honest young man who came from the Zhen Hang Mountain. He has a strong love for food and would repeatedly strive for it, much to the annoyance of his companion, Leixia. Like Kilik, he was trained in the secret arts of the Ling-Sheng Su by his master, Kong Xiuqiang. Sometime before the events of the game, he was bequeathed with Kilik's inheritance, the sacred bō staff Kali-Yuga, under orders of Edge Master, who sensed Kilik's tragic fate. Together with Leixia, Natsu, and their leader, Maxi, Xiba travels throughout the world, eventually helping Patroklos to complete Soul Calibur with Kali-Yuga's power (as well as Dvapara Yuga's, owned by Leixia).

According to the official artbook of the game, SOULCALIBUR – New Legends of Project Soul, he is actually Kilik and Xianghua's son and Leixia's estranged older half-brother. His birth is the result of their intimate meeting and he was nearly killed following the orders of the Xianghua's grandfather. Negotiations with Ming Empire general Yan Wujin, however, allowed Xiba to live secretly with Xianghua's father Kong Xiuqiang so as to not revealing the scandal as the condition for Wujin to marry Xianghua. As many others such as Goku from Dragon Ball, his look and fighting style is based on Sun Wukong from the classic Chinese novel, Journey to the West.

=== Z.W.E.I. ===
Voiced by (English): Matthew Mercer
Voiced by (Japanese): Kenta Miyake

Z.W.E.I. (ツヴァイ, Tsuvai) is a mysterious, brooding man who wields a sword with three handles and can summon a lupine spirit named "E.I.N.", who is actually Minion, a secondary soul that coexists with Z.W.E.I.'s own human soul. While much of his backstory is unknown, the official site states that he was separated from his mother when he was still a child, and he had to endure hardships in his life before he was eventually taken by the leader of Schwarzwind, Siegfried, who raised him as a warrior. Z.W.E.I. is currently traveling with Viola, a woman who also has inhuman powers like himself. Z.W.E.I. advises Patroklos to revolt against Dumas as he had merely used him and later assists him in finding Soul Calibur under orders from Siegfried, alongside Viola, though he leaves them after finding his sister, Pyrrha. Later, when Nightmare has declared war across Europe, he confronts him in his castle and manages to kill him. However, a malfested Pyrrha appears and stabs him, after which he falls to the chasm, his fate unknown.

== Introduced in Soulcalibur VI ==
=== Azwel ===
Voiced by (English): Taliesin Jaffe
Voiced by (Japanese): Masashi Ebara

Azwel (アズウェル, Azuweru) is a man of extraordinary intelligence and a scholar in many fields, including history, medicine, war, and art. His studies about the history of humanity brought him to the conclusion that humanity would self-destruct through wars and other calamities. His fanatical love for the people led him to enact a terrifying plan to save them from themselves. Azwel also infects Grøh with Soul Edge, defects from the Aval Organization, manipulates Raphael into searching for Soul Edge, and assaults Amy to discover her future self as Viola.

His weapon is a pair of gloves named Palindrome: the right glove includes a fragment of Soul Edge, while the left one has a piece of Soul Calibur. Azwel draws his power from the memories of past battles, preserved within those fragments. While he appears unarmed, his gloves allow him to summon a variety of deadly weapons, which he can use with brutal effects.

=== Grøh ===
Voiced by (English): Xander Mobus
Voiced by (Japanese): Takahiro Sakurai

Grøh (グロー, Gurō) is a member of the mysterious Aval Organization, a secret group with origins rooted in ancient times, who came to be when a king used the spirit sword to defeat its cursed counterpart, and with his dying breath, entrusted them with both the blade and his unfinished mission. Each new generation has taken on the group's mission to rid the world of "Outsiders" — those connected with the cursed sword, the Malfested. Aval Organization had been a sworn allied force to Hilde's home kingdom, the Wolfkrone for generations. Little is known about him, save for that he was a fearsome warrior. Though his fighting style is shrouded in mystery, he wields two swords that can connect with each other.

He was turned into an "Outsider" by Nightmare, and progressively continued by the traitor Azwel, the man who responsible for infected Grøh and his best friend, Curtis, for the sorcerer's evil experiments. After having remaining willpower to negate his mind from becoming an "Outsider", using the power of "Outsider" to counteract the likes of "Outsiders"-minded warriors, Azwel included, Grøh found a new purpose to put the fellow "Outsider" victims like him a trial whether they have a strong will left to suppress the malfestation or not. Following Maxi's first victor against Astaroth, shortly before Kilik finally purifies his malfestation and helps Xianghua defeats Nightmare/Inferno, Grøh was the one of found a critically injured Maxi. Unbeknownst to Grøh, Curtis survives but suffers amnesia and becomes a malfested army. Although Curtis slowly begins to recover his memory of Grøh before a one-year war depicted in 1590 A.D. begins.

== Critical reception ==
In 2016, University of Delaware professor Rachel Hutchinson cited the various characters of the series examples of 'virtual colonialism', noting the designers' emphasis on particular traits to differentiate the non-Japanese characters as exotic 'others'. Analyzing each characters' design in the original Soulcalibur, she cited examples of stereotypes commonly viewed in Japan of other cultures, such as Li Long's lack of aging between his appearance in Soul Edge and Soulcalibur, or Ivy's significant stature compared to Eastern female characters. She later made use of the Soulcalibur II cast in a study involving students, focusing on their initial reactions to their designs and subsequent reactions after playing as the characters.

As the series has progressed, some media outlets have complained about the increased sexualization of the female characters. In particular, comments have focused on the perceived increase in the breast sizes of Ivy, Sophitia and Taki from one game to the next, while their attire has grown more revealing. Several other aspects further exasperated this reaction, including advertisements that focused on Ivy's sexual attributes, the commissioning of a hentai artist to create outfits for the female characters in Soulcalibur: Lost Swords, and the release of a breast size comparison chart used by the developers. Cecilia D'Anastasio in an article for Kotaku felt that it ostracized female players specifically by leading her and others to feel women weren't the target audience, and stated "Bandai Namco has pigeonholed what could be a stellar fighting game for everyone."
