= Soulcalibur VI =

2018 video game

- Cover art featuring Mitsurugi and Geralt of Rivia
- Developers: Bandai Namco Studios; Dimps
- Publisher: Bandai Namco Entertainment
- Director: Yoshinori Takahashi
- Producers: Michinori Ozawa; Motohiro Okubo
- Designers: Tomofumi Oosaka; Takashi Yoshida
- Programmer: Masanori Ota
- Artists: Takuji Kawano; Hiroaki Hashimoto
- Writer: Sohei Kamada
- Composer: Junichi Nakatsuru
- Series: Soulcalibur
- Engine: Unreal Engine 4
- Platforms: PlayStation 4 Windows; Xbox One
- Release: October 19, 2018
- Genre: Fighting
- Modes: Single-player, multiplayer

Soulcalibur VI (ソウルキャリバーVI, Sōrukyaribā Shikkusu) is a 2018 fighting game developed by Bandai Namco Studios and Dimps, and published by Bandai Namco Entertainment. As the seventh main installment and a reboot of the Soulcalibur series, it was released for the PlayStation 4, Windows, and Xbox One on October 19, 2018. The game revisits events from Soulcalibur (1998), with the aim of "uncovering hidden truths". Players engage in combat as they select from a diverse roster of characters, including both returning favorites and new additions.

Soulcalibur VI retains classic mechanics like the 8-Way Run and Guard Impact while introducing innovative gameplay features such as Reversal Edge and a revamped Soul Charge system. The narrative unfolds through two main modes: Soul Chronicle and Libra of Soul. Soul Chronicle presents a linear story focused on the main characters and the threat of Nightmare, featuring individual character storylines that provide depth to the overarching plot. In contrast, Libra of Soul allows players to create a custom character, known as the Conduit, who navigates a journey to close astral fissures and confront the rogue scientist Azwel, ultimately shaping the fate of the world through player choices.

== Gameplay ==
Following the tradition of previous installments in the Soulcalibur series, Soulcalibur VI's gameplay involves two weapon-wielding combatants battling against one another using a 3D system. The game retains many familiar gameplay elements, including the 8-Way Run, Guard Impact, and character creation, while enhancing the traditional formula with the introduction of new mechanics such as Reversal Edge and the newly revamped Soul Charge. The Reversal Edge allows players to defend against an incoming attack and quickly counterattack, accompanied by a slow-motion effect that enables more defensive options for players.

== Characters ==
Soulcalibur VI features a base roster of 21 playable characters. Additional characters were made available through downloadable content (DLC) following the game's launch, bringing the total number of characters to 29. Additionally, there are 100 slots for custom characters. New characters introduced in Soulcalibur VI are indicated in italics.

- Astaroth
- Azwel
- Cervantes de Leon
- Geralt of Rivia ^{a}
- Grøh
- Inferno ^{b}
- Ivy Valentine
- Kilik
- Maxi
- Heishiro Mitsurugi
- Nightmare
- Raphael Sorel
- Seong Mi-na
- Siegfried Schtauffen
- Sophitia Alexandra
- Taki
- Talim
- Voldo
- Chai Xianghua
- Yoshimitsu
- Zasalamel

=== DLC ===
- 2B (YoRHa No. 2 Type B) ^{a} ^{1}
- Amy Sorel ^{1}
- Cassandra Alexandra ^{1}
- Haohmaru ^{a} ^{2}
- Hildegard von Krone ^{2}
- Hwang Seong-gyeong ^{2}
- Setsuka ^{2}
- Tira ^{1}

=== Notes ===
^a Guest character; DLC guests are not part of the game's storyline
^b Unlockable, but unplayable online
^1 2 Number denotes the season in which the character was added as DLC

== Plot ==
Soulcalibur VI serves as both a sequel and a reboot to the series, taking place during the 16th century to revisit the events of the Soulcalibur (1998) in order to "uncover hidden truths". It occurs after the events of Soulcalibur V (2012), where Cassandra from the original timeline warns her past self about the grim future facing the Alexandra family. Amy's original future self is revealed to be Viola, and Zasalamel receives a vision from his future self that leads him to abandon his quest for death, choosing instead to guide humanity toward a brighter future.

The plot of Soulcalibur VI occurs from 1583 to 1589. The story is divided into two distinct modes. The Soul Chronicle mode is the main narrative, focusing on the primary characters and the immediate threat posed by Nightmare. In this mode, the story unfolds similarly to a visual novel, featuring illustrated, voiced cutscenes that convey the plot and are interspersed with matches that represent significant battles within the story. The main narrative centers around Kilik as he sets out to confront the Soul Edge and Nightmare, primarily taking place in Europe. Additionally, each character is provided with an individual storyline that details their backstories or serves as side narratives to the main plot; one character's story chapter occurs after the primary narrative, a year prior to the events of the original trilogy.

The second story mode, titled Libra of Soul, takes place shortly after the Evil Seed event of 1583, during which Siegfried acquires the Soul Edge and becomes Nightmare. In this mode, the player creates a custom character who serves as the protagonist. Predominantly set in Asia, the player embarks on a journey to prevent Azwel from recreating the Evil Seed while grappling with their own malfestation. This mode runs concurrently with the main narrative in the Soul Chronicle, and at times, the player character will encounter other characters from the main story.

=== Libra of Soul ===
Note: Due to the number of in-game side missions, this summary is based solely on the linear story

In 1584, about a year after the Evil Seed ravaged the world, the hero, referred to as the Conduit, awakens from a violent nightmare involving Soul Edge and a mysterious realm. Zasalamel appears before them and explains that the energy of the Evil Seed has linked their soul to the realm known as Astral Chaos. Unless they absorb energy from the astral fissures that have been appearing recently, their soul will be shredded from the pressure, resulting in death. Zasalamel then trains the Conduit to absorb the energy from the fissures and gives them a special scale called the Libra of Soul.

After closing several fissures with the help of Maxi and Mitsurugi, the Conduit is approached by Grøh, Dion, and Natalie, members of the mysterious Aval Organization tasked with hunting down the rogue Aval scientist Azwel and his cult-like followers, the Qualifiers. Knowing only that Azwel has taken an interest in the astral fissures and the circumstances surrounding the Evil Seed, Grøh conscripts the Conduit into their group, as they are the only one capable of closing the fissures. However, Azwel manages to gain the energy from the fissures and reveals his intention to create a similar Evil Seed event he calls the "Ultimate Seed" in order to protect humanity from its own self-destructive tendencies. Grøh, partially corrupted by Soul Edge's evil due to Azwel's meddling, succumbs to the darkness and tackles Azwel off a cliff, but to no avail.

Uncertain of Azwel's plans, the Conduit seeks out Zasalamel for guidance. Zasalamel informs the Conduit that, although their absorption of the fissures has made them stronger and mitigated Astral Chaos's hazardous effects, only Soul Edge and Soul Calibur possess the power to stop Azwel. However, both blades have been sealed away inside Astral Chaos, and the Conduit must draw upon their power through combat with individuals connected to the weapons (Kilik, Xianghua, and Siegfried for Soul Calibur, and Taki, Sophitia, and Cervantes de Leon for Soul Edge). Once they gather enough strength, the Conduit confronts Azwel, and despite Azwel's attempts to use them as the final piece of the Ultimate Seed, the Conduit defeats him.

However, before they can rest, the Conduit is contacted by the Aval Organization and informed that Grøh survived his encounter with Azwel but must be eliminated due to his malfestation. After tracking him to Scandinavia, the Conduit once again draws upon the Soul swords to confront him.

The ending of Libra of Souls is influenced by the player's alignment throughout the game. If aligned with darkness, the Conduit draws on Soul Edge and strikes down Grøh before burying him. If aligned with light, the Conduit draws on Soul Calibur and purges Grøh of his malfestation. Grøh then continues his work with the Aval Organization from a distance.

== Development and release ==
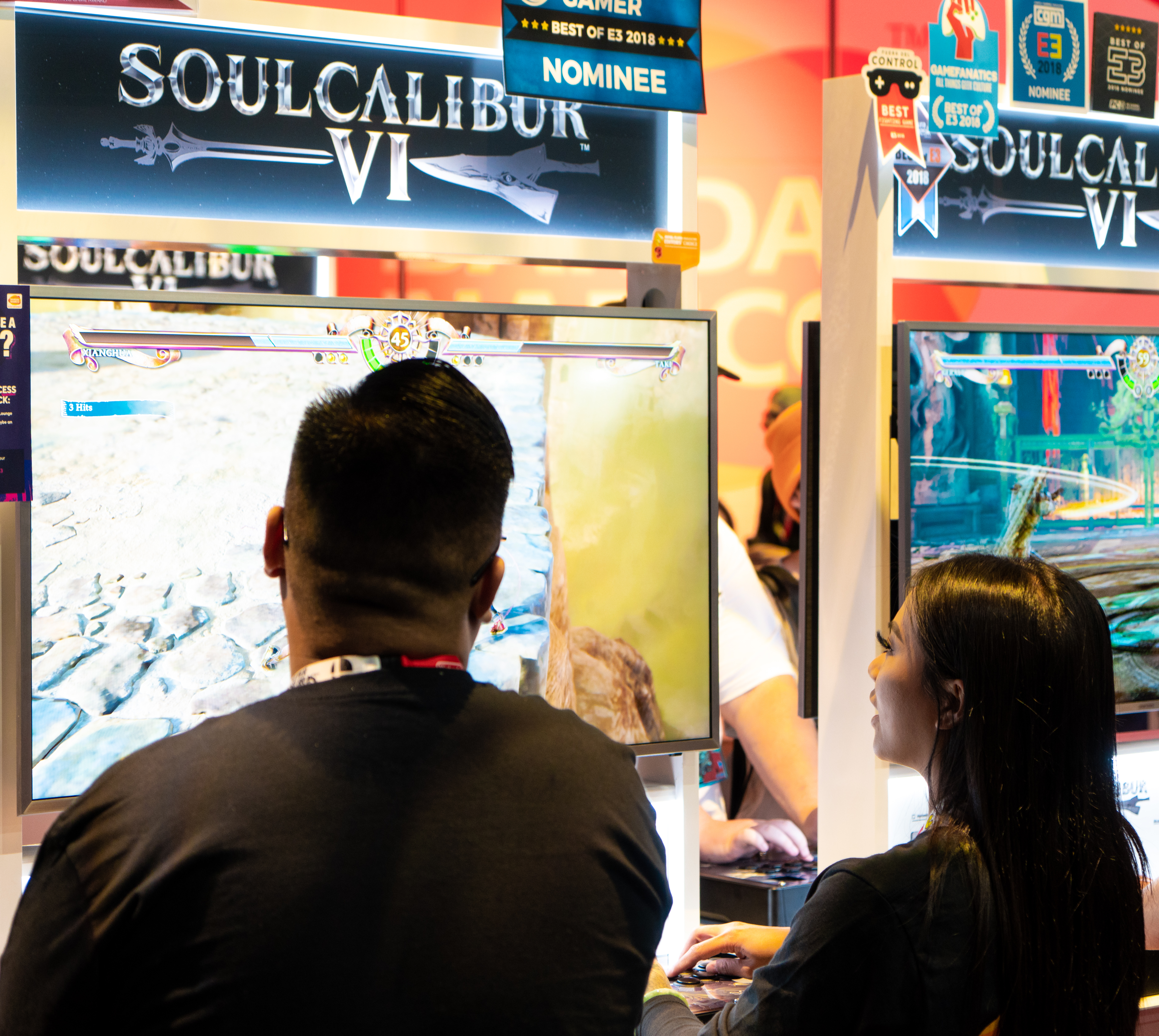
Soulcalibur VI demo at E3 2018

Soulcalibur VI was announced during The Game Awards 2017. Development on the game began over three years prior. Producer Motohiro Okubo described the game as a celebration of the franchise's 20th anniversary. Bandai Namco placed a greater emphasis on story elements compared to previous games in the series. The game utilizes Unreal Engine 4, the same engine used in Bandai Namco's previous fighting game, Tekken 7. According to Okubo, the title's code name was "Luxor" to reflect the team's intention of creating a brighter experience akin to the original Soulcalibur. Additional mechanics were introduced to assist players with the game's learning curve.

The game was released for PlayStation 4, Windows, and Xbox One on October 19, 2018. Its Collector's Edition included an art book, a soundtrack, a Sophitia statue, and a metal case. A series of season passes for the game each included four additional characters and further items for character customization.

== Reception ==
Reception

Aggregate score
Aggregator	Score
Metacritic	PC: 80/100; PS4: 84/100; XONE: 84/100

Review scores
Publication	Score
Destructoid	85%
Electronic Gaming Monthly	8/10
Game Informer	8.75/10
GameRevolution	4.5/5
GameSpot	8/10
IGN	8.9/10
PlayStation Official Magazine – UK	8/10
VideoGamer.com	8/10
4Players	84%
HobbyConsolas	85%
New York Daily News	5/5

Soulcalibur VI received "generally favorable" reviews, according to review aggregator website Metacritic. Both Game Informer and EGM praised the story modes. VideoGamer.com lauded the environments, while Destructoid highlighted the music and the character roster. GameRevolution reviewer Jason Faulkner stated it was "one of the most enjoyable fighting games I’ve ever played". IGN summarized it, saying, "The new mechanics add new layers of strategy and mind games while the one-two punch of Libra of Soul and Soul Chronicle will provide hours upon hours of fantastic single-player content." 4Players praised the netcode, while HobbyConsolas commended the character creation. GameSpot's Tamoor Hussain remarked that the game was "both intuitive and deep". Dead or Alive 6 director and producer Yohei Shimbori expressed confusion over why his series faced criticism for its fan service content, while Soulcalibur VI "can do it and doesn't get a beating over it".

=== Sales ===
The game reached number 5 in the UK sales chart. In Japan, it sold 24,049 copies within its first week on sale, reaching number 3. It reached number 8 in Australia and number 7 in New Zealand. In the US, it was the 8th most downloaded game of October on the PlayStation Store. Sales were reported to have increased compared to Soulcalibur V and were also compared to Soulcalibur III, Soulcalibur, and Soul Edge, but still lower than Soulcalibur II and Soulcalibur IV. In 2019, Namco reported the launch as "successful". As of July 2021, the game has sold over two million copies worldwide.

=== Accolades ===
Year	Award	Category	Result
2018	Game Critics Awards	Best Fighting Game	Nominated
2018	The Game Awards 2018	Best Fighting Game	Nominated
2018	Gamers' Choice Awards	Fan Favorite Fighting Game	Nominated
2018	Titanium Awards	Best Fighting Game	Nominated
2019	New York Game Awards	Raging Bull Award for Best Fighting Game	Nominated
2019	22nd Annual D.I.C.E. Awards	Fighting Game of the Year	Nominated
2019	NAVGTR Awards	Franchise, Fighting Game	Nominated
2019	SXSW Gaming Awards	Most Promising New eSports Game	Nominated
