= Soulcalibur V =

2012 video game

- European Cover art depicting Ezio Auditore da Firenze in the background, and Patroklos and Nightmare in the foreground
- Developer: Project Soul
- Publisher: Namco Bandai Games (Note: Released under the Namco label)
- Directors: Daishi Odashima; Haruki Suzaki
- Producers: Hisaharu Tago; Yoshito Higuchi
- Programmers: Masaaki Hoshino; Tomoko Imura
- Artists: Hideo Yoshie; Sei Nakatani
- Composers: Junichi Nakatsuru; Hiroki Kikuta; Inon Zur; Andrew Aversa; Cris Velasco; Jesper Kyd
- Series: Soulcalibur
- Platform: PlayStation 3, Xbox 360
- Release: NA: January 31, 2012; JP: February 2, 2012; EU: February 3, 2012
- Genre: Fighting
- Modes: Single-player, multiplayer

Soulcalibur V (ソウルキャリバーV, Sōrukyaribā Faibu) is a 2012 fighting game developed by Project Soul and published by Namco Bandai Games for the PlayStation 3 and Xbox 360. As the sixth main installment in Namco's Soulcalibur series, Soulcalibur V serves as a follow-up to Soulcalibur IV (2008). It retains the weapon-based combat that characterizes the series while introducing a new protagonist, Patroklos, who aims to free his sister from a curse inflicted upon her by an ancient weapon. This installment marks the conclusion of the original Soul series timeline.

The game received positive reviews, being praised for its gameplay, atmosphere, and character creation. However, it faced criticism for the removal of fan-favorite characters, the newly introduced characters, and for its story mode. It was succeeded by Soulcalibur VI (2018).

== Gameplay ==
A screenshot from a fight between Algol and Mitsurugi

Like the previous games in the series, Soulcalibur V is a weapon-based fighting game. Players utilize high and low vertical and horizontal attacks to damage opposing characters and can block incoming attacks or parry enemy moves to gain a tactical advantage. The game features an updated "Critical Edge" system, allowing players to fill a meter and unleash powerful special attacks.

The game offers a variety of gameplay modes. In Story Mode, players control the protagonist, Patroklos, along with various supporting characters, guiding him through a series of battles divided into 20 episodes. Unlike previous installments, not all characters are playable in Story Mode. The arcade mode allows players to choose any character and face six opponents in time trial matches. Additionally, the game includes Quick Battle mode, which enables players to unlock titles for their online profiles, as well as an extra "Legendary Souls" mode. Like its predecessors, Soulcalibur V features a variety of multiplayer modes, allowing players to compete against each other both online and offline. The character creation mode from previous games has also been retained.

== Plot ==
The game takes place in 1607, 17 years after the events of Soulcalibur IV, and centers around the children of Soul series veteran Sophitia. Her son, Patroklos, serves as a soldier for Graf Dumas, the Holy Roman Empire's appointed ruler of Hungary, and is tasked with eliminating the "malfested," a curse bestowed upon anyone who comes into contact with the evil weapon Soul Edge, in exchange for help in locating his sister, Pyrrha, who has been missing since he was a child. While searching a town to root out the malfested, he is attacked and defeated by half-werewolf Z.W.E.I, who reveals that Dumas is not who he seems. Confronting Dumas, Patroklos learns that Dumas is actually aligned with Soul Edge, and the "malfested" he had been killing were innocent people he needed to die to restore the blade.

Escaping Dumas' control, Patroklos tracks down Z.W.E.I., a member of Siegfried's revived Schwarzwind. Siegfried inducts him into the group and informs him that Pyrrha is being held captive by Soul Edge devotee Tira, assigning Z.W.E.I. and Schwarzwind mystic Viola to accompany him. After a brief skirmish, Tira seemingly releases Pyrrha to her brother, who abandons Z.W.E.I. and Viola to bring her sister home. However, upon arriving in Greece, they are confronted by Dumas, who reveals himself as the vessel for Soul Edge's physical form, Nightmare. Complicating matters, Pyrrha has become a malfested, having been slowly corrupted by Tira over the seventeen years since her capture. Patroklos flees in horror after Nightmare's defeat, causing a distraught Pyrrha to wholeheartedly side with Tira.

Returning to the Schwarzwind base, Siegfried entrusts Patroklos with Soul Calibur, the only weapon capable of saving his sister and stopping Nightmare. However, it has changed forms and weakened significantly since its last battle with Soul Edge. Seeking to strengthen the blade, Patroklos tracks down Nightmare's former pawn Ivy, who knows a ritual to enhance the blade, but it requires its other two counterparts, Krita-Yuga and Dvapara-Yuga, which are possessed by a young staff fighter named Xiba and Leixia, the daughter of Xianghua. During the ritual, Patroklos has a vision of his mother, Sophitia, who tells him that the only way to save Pyrrha is to kill her. Meanwhile, Nightmare wages war on Europe to strengthen Soul Edge, with Schwarzwind fighting to stop him. Z.W.E.I. manages to kill the still weakened Nightmare but is quickly disposed of by Tira and Pyrrha, who proceed with Tira's true goal of turning Pyrrha into a new host for Soul Edge. However, as soon as Pyrrha picks up the demonic blade, Patroklos arrives and kills her with Soul Calibur.

Shocked by his actions, Patroklos' mind winds up in Astral Chaos, where an encounter with Edge Master convinces him to travel back and save Pyrrha by removing Soul Edge, thereby severing its control over her. However, "Sophitia" encases him in glass, intending to take over his body to do the job he could not. When Pyrrha comes to her senses, her desperate attempt to save Patroklos frees his mind enough to confront his "mother," who reveals herself to be Elysium, the spirit of Soul Calibur. After a long battle, Patroklos breaks free from Elysium's control, and together, he and Pyrrha seal away both swords.

== Characters ==
The game features 28 playable characters, including 11 that are new to the series. The new characters include two versions of Pyrrha and Patroklos. The game also introduces the mysterious Z.W.E.I. as well as Viola, an amnesiac fortune teller (later revealed to be Raphael's grown-up adopted daughter, Amy Sorel). Several new characters utilize the fighting styles of previous characters in the series: Taki's student and successor Natsu, Xianghua's daughter Yan Leixia, and her illegitimate eldest son Xiba, who employs a fighting style reminiscent of his long-lost father, Kilik. Elysium mimics the styles of female characters, similar to how Kilik now mimics male characters and Edge Master mimics all characters. Finally, Ezio Auditore da Firenze, from the Assassin's Creed series, appears as a guest character.

The game also features several returning characters, namely Aeon Calcos (Lizardman), Algol, Astaroth, Cervantes, Edge Master, Hilde, Ivy, Kilik, Maxi, Mitsurugi, Nightmare, Raphael, Siegfried, Tira, Voldo and Yoshimitsu. In addition, Dampierre, who first appeared in Soulcalibur: Broken Destiny, is available for players who pre-ordered the game, and was later made available via DLC.

- Aeon Calcos
- Algol ^{c}
- Astaroth
- Cervantes
- Dampierre ^{d}
- Devil Jin ^{e}
- Edge Master ^{c}
- Elysium ^{a} ^{c}
- Ezio Auditore da Firenze ^{b}
- Heishiro Mitsurugi
- Hilde
- Ivy
- Kilik ^{c}
- Leixia ^{a}
- Maxi
- Natsu ^{a}
- Nightmare
- Patroklos Alexander ^{a}
- Patroklos Alexandra (Alpha) ^{a} ^{c}
- Pyrrha Alexandra ^{a}
- Pyrrha Alexandra (Omega) ^{a} ^{c}
- Raphael
- Siegfried
- Tira
- Viola ^{a}
- Voldo
- Xiba ^{a}
- Yoshimitsu
- Z.W.E.I. ^{a}

^a Newcomers
^b Guest character
^c Unlockable
^d DLC only
^e Moveset available through Character Creation

== Development ==
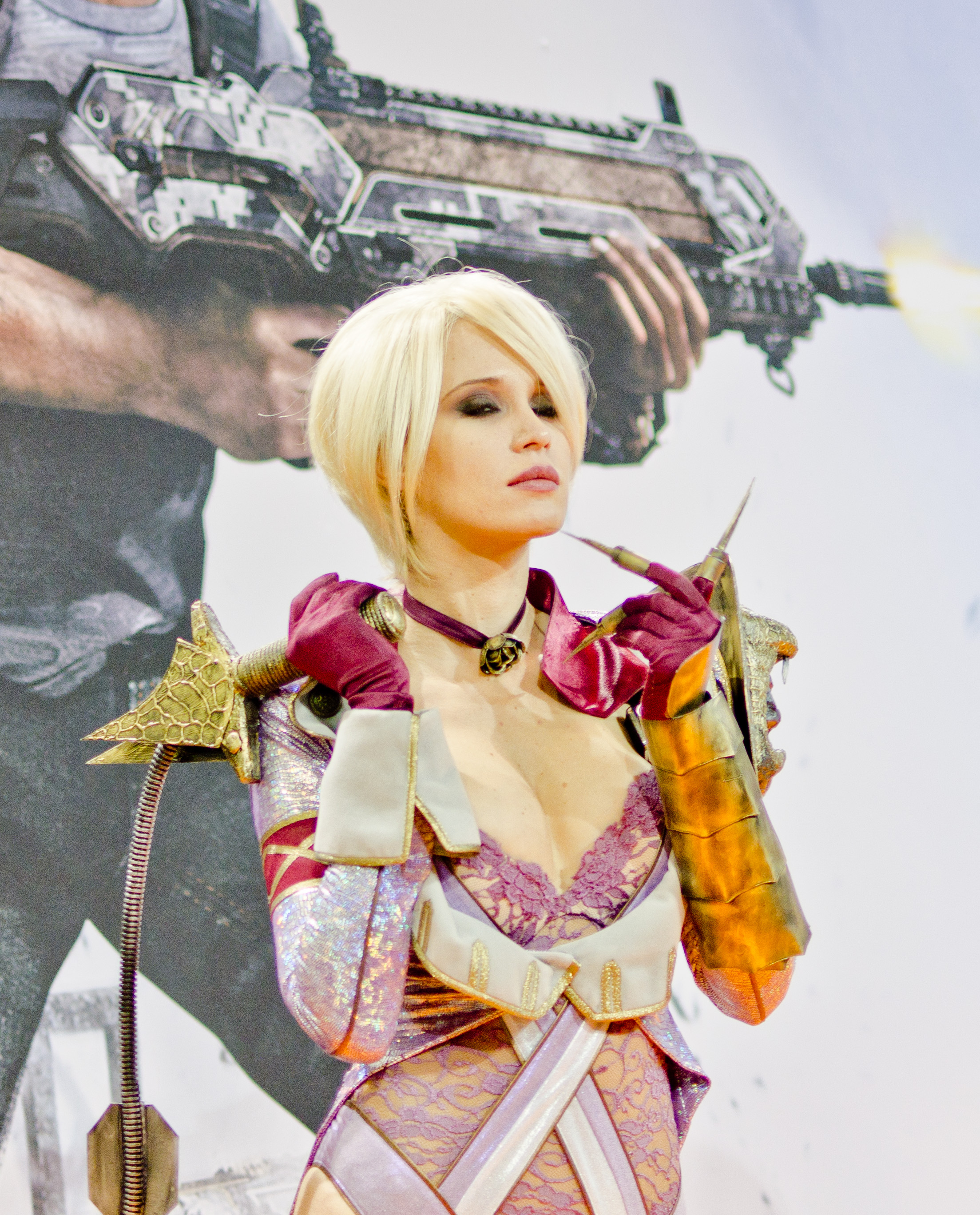
A promotional model for Ivy at IgroMir 2011

A petition for Soulcalibur V posted on Facebook caught the attention of Katsuhiro Harada, producer of Namco's Tekken series. He accepted suggestions and promised to advocate for fans in the creation of a new Soulcalibur game. The game was teased as early as 2010, when game director Daishi Odashima tweeted "SC is back!." On December 25, 2010, a new Soul series project was announced to be underway, led by a new director. In late April 2011, Odashima tweeted again, stating "Hopefully I will be able to announce something mid-May." Soulcalibur V was officially announced by Namco Bandai on May 11, 2011.

Development of the game's story mode was outsourced to CyberConnect2, developers of the Capcom game Asura's Wrath. The story was originally planned to be four times longer, but it was reduced due to time and manpower constraints.

== Release ==
Pre-order bonuses included the playable character Dampierre from Soulcalibur: Broken Destiny. A collector's edition of Soulcalibur V was released alongside the standard edition in a book-like package containing the game, a CD of the game's music soundtrack, The Art of SoulCalibur V book, a making-of DVD, and exclusive White and Dark Knight character creation downloadable content.

Namco has released additional downloadable content for the game. The first "Launch Day" pack includes a set of character customization items described as "exotic," as well as music from Soul Edge and Soulcalibur. The Valentine's Day pack, released on February 14, includes customization items described as "fearsome," along with music from Soulcalibur II and Soulcalibur III. The February 28 pack includes more customization items and music from Soulcalibur IV and Soulcalibur: Broken Destiny. The music tracks are also available individually. Further DLC packs were announced and planned for release once a month.

== Reception ==
Reception

Aggregate score
Aggregator	Score
Metacritic	PS3: 81/100; X360: 77/100

Review scores
Publication	Score
1Up.com	B+
Computer and Video Games	8.9/10
Electronic Gaming Monthly	6.0/10
Eurogamer	8/10
G4	4/5
Game Informer	8.5/10
GameRevolution	4/5
GameSpot	7.5/10
GamesRadar+	9/10
GamesTM	8/10
GameTrailers	8.7/10
IGN	7.5/10
Official Xbox Magazine (UK)	7/10
Official Xbox Magazine (US)	8/10
PALGN	8/10
TeamXbox	7.5/10

Critical reception of Soulcalibur V was generally positive, with average Metacritic scores of 77 (Xbox 360) and 81 (PS3). Jose Otero of 1Up.com criticized the story mode but was overall positive in his review, stating that the game "reinvents the series again." PSM3 stated, "Faster and more aggressive, SCV is what the series needed. Long-term fans may bemoan the changes, but this is the perfect starting point for newcomers." Adam Biessener of Game Informer called it "the best Soulcalibur ever." On the other hand, IGN's Steven Lambrechts wrote that Soulcalibur V "feels like more of the same" and expressed disappointment with the game, particularly criticizing its main story mode. Jordan Mallory of Joystiq claimed that Soulcalibur V "is simultaneously one of the best Soul Calibur games ever made and the worst Soul Calibur game ever made." Besides the story mode, many reviewers criticized the absence of the series's longstanding female characters, such as Sophitia, Talim, Cassandra, Xianghua, Taki, and Seong Mi-na.

During the 16th Annual D.I.C.E. Awards, the Academy of Interactive Arts & Sciences nominated Soulcalibur V for the "Fighting Game of the Year," which was ultimately awarded to PlayStation All-Stars Battle Royale. It was also nominated for "Fighting Game of the Year" by Igromania, which was awarded to Dead or Alive 5.

Soulcalibur V reached number 4 in the UK PS3 sales charts, and number 3 on the Xbox. In eight months, the game sold 1.38 million units worldwide, which is somewhat less than the 2.3 million copies of Soulcalibur IV sold during its first eight months.
