= Soulcalibur IV =

2008 video game

- Premium Edition case art depicting Siegfried and Nightmare
- Developer: Project Soul
- Publisher: Namco Bandai Games (Note: Released under the Namco label outside North America)
- Directors: Katsutoshi Sasaki; Katsuhiro Harada; Daishi Odashima
- Producers: Hiroaki Yotoriyama; Mitsuo Kashiwagi; Masashi Tommy
- Designer: Noriyuki Hiyama
- Programmer: Masaaki Hoshino
- Artists: Masashi Kubo; Yasuyuki Kobori; Hideo Yoshie
- Writers: Yoshihiro Nakagawa; Sohhei Kamada
- Composers: Junichi Nakatsuru; Keiki Kobayashi; Hiroyuki Fujita; Masaharu Iwata; Music from Star Wars composed by John Williams
- Series: Soulcalibur
- Platforms: PlayStation 3, Xbox 360
- Release: NA: July 29, 2008; JP: July 31, 2008; AU: July 31, 2008; EU: July 31, 2008; UK: August 1, 2008; NZL: August 1, 2008
- Genre: Fighting
- Modes: Single-player, multiplayer

Soulcalibur IV (Note: Japanese: ソウルキャリバーIV, Hepburn: Sōrukyaribā Fō) is a 2008 fighting game developed and published by Namco Bandai Games for the PlayStation 3 and Xbox 360. As the fifth main entry in the Soulcalibur series, it marks a significant evolution in gameplay with enhanced graphics and new features compared to its predecessor Soulcalibur III (2005), including the introduction of three guest characters from the Star Wars franchise: Darth Vader, Yoda, and the Apprentice.

The game introduces a variety of modes, such as Story, Arcade, and the innovative Tower of Lost Souls, where players face challenges for rewards. It also includes an extensive Character Creation mode, allowing for detailed customization of fighters, and a new online multiplayer feature that enables players to compete in both Standard and Special VS modes. Notably, the Critical Finish system and the unique Force Meter mechanics for guest characters add depth and strategy to combat. This installment is recognized for its contribution to the franchise, paving the way for future developments. The game received mainly positive reviews; it was followed by a handheld title, Soulcalibur: Broken Destiny (2009), and later a full sequel, Soulcalibur V (2012).

== Gameplay ==
Soulcalibur IV features Story, Arcade, Training, and Museum modes. A new mode, Tower of Lost Souls, requires players to win battles to gain rewards. The game runs in HD resolution with 5.1 channel surround sound on both platforms.

The Character Creation mode from Soulcalibur III returns in Soulcalibur IV. However, instead of including original weapon styles for use with certain classes of fighters, Soulcalibur IV allows players to choose which character from the series they would like their created character to mimic. This differs from Soulcalibur III, which featured many unique styles such as "Grieve Edge". The styles of Algol, the bonus characters, and the Star Wars guest characters cannot be used by player-created characters. A wide array of new equipment pieces are available for use in Soulcalibur IV's Character Creation mode, and new options include a broader range of character voices and the ability to adjust their pitch. Players may also modify a character's general physique and muscularity.

Additionally, equipped items now affect a character's statistics. Armor, weapons, and accessories may increase health, attack, or defense; they may also grant skill points that allow the character to equip special traits affecting playstyle. These traits may include automatically triggered guard impacts, the ability to inflict damage on a blocking opponent, or even a statistic increase based on parameters such as an opponent's alignment or gender. Standard characters can also be modified in this manner, albeit only modestly, allowing custom costumes and skill sets to be used in Special VS. mode. Custom characters may still be utilized in Standard VS. mode but without any special abilities gained through equipment or weapon choice. One profile is permitted for Offline VS. mode, meaning that only one profile's created characters can be loaded at any given time.

Multi-fighter battles in Soulcalibur IV employ a different structure from its predecessors, known as Active Matching Battle (AMB). Similar to the tag system of games such as The King of Fighters 2003, the AMB system allows players to switch to other members of their fighter party mid-battle. Instead of starting a new round for each defeated opponent, new opponents enter the battle immediately after a K.O., with the exception of certain combatants. Matches utilizing the AMB system only appear in the Story and Tower of Lost Souls modes.

Soulcalibur IV introduces an all-new Critical Finish system. Next to a player's health meter is a colored gem known as the Soul Gauge. The gem changes color when the player blocks an attack or has their own attack blocked by a Guard Impact. The color transitions from blue to green, then to red, and eventually flashes red. The player's Soul Gauge regenerates if they successfully hit the opponent with an attack, guard, or otherwise. If a character manages to deplete the opponent's Soul Gauge, the enemy suffers a piece of armor destruction (characters now display permanent visual damage, such as broken and torn clothing) and experiences a brief stun during which the character can execute a powerful Critical Finish move by pressing all four face buttons simultaneously. Each character has a unique Critical Finish move. Namco developed the Soul Gauge to mitigate the advantages of constant guarding, thus enhancing the game's tempo and making matches more offensive.

The Star Wars guest characters, Darth Vader, Yoda, and the Apprentice, utilize unique attacks powered by the Force. Darth Vader can employ Force-based blasts, punches, and chokes; Yoda can use the Force to propel himself into the air for intricate aerial attacks; and finally, the Apprentice is capable of wielding Force lightning and other dark-side abilities. These moves consume a special Force Meter, which gradually recharges when not in use. If the Force Meter is depleted, the player momentarily loses control of the character.

For the first time in the series, Soulcalibur IV includes an online multiplayer option. The versus modes available in online battles are Standard VS (for classic matches) and Special VS (for customized characters). Created characters are playable in the online multiplayer mode. A player's wins and losses are recorded and used to establish a ranking level that reflects their online skill.

== Characters ==
Soulcalibur IV features a roster of 34 fighters. Many characters from the Soul series return, along with two newcomers and three guest characters from the Star Wars franchise: Darth Vader, Yoda, and The Apprentice. Initially, Darth Vader was exclusive to the PlayStation 3, while Yoda was available on the Xbox 360 as part of a full game download; Namco later made both characters available as downloadable content on the opposite platform for a fee. The Apprentice, the main protagonist of Star Wars: The Force Unleashed, is playable on both the PlayStation 3 and Xbox 360 versions.

Revenant, Frederick Schtauffen and several other minor characters from the Soul series make an appearance in battle, and most can be created in Character Creation mode. Several bonus characters designed by manga artists (Angol Fear, Ashlotte, Kamikirimusi, Scheherazade, and Shura) are also playable in the game, utilizing the fighting styles of returning characters. They are designed by Mine Yoshizaki, Ito Ōgure, Hirokazu Hisayuki, Yutaka Izubuchi, and Hiroya Oku, respectively.

- Algol ^{b} ^{d}
- Amy ^{b}
- Angol Fear ^{c}
- Ashlotte ^{c}
- Astaroth
- Cassandra
- Cervantes ^{b}
- Darth Vader ^{a}
- Hilde ^{d}
- Ivy
- Kamikirimusi ^{c}
- Kilik
- Lizardman ^{b}
- Maxi
- Mitsurugi
- Nightmare
- Raphael
- Rock ^{b}
- Scheherazade ^{c}
- Seong Mi-na ^{b}
- Setsuka ^{b}
- Shura ^{c}
- Siegfried
- Sophitia ^{b}
- Taki
- Talim ^{b}
- The Apprentice ^{a} ^{b}
- Tira
- Voldo
- Xianghua
- Yoda ^{a}
- Yoshimitsu ^{b}
- Yun-seong ^{b}
- Zasalamel ^{b}

^a Guest character
^b Unlockable
^c Bonus unlockable characters
^d Newcomers

== Plot ==
The story of Soulcalibur IV, conveyed through in-game written profiles and cutscenes, centers around the ancient king Algol, his tower, and his connection to the origin of the spirit sword known as Soulcalibur. Each character's motivations and relationships with others are explored in a mode called Chain of Souls. As is customary, none of the individual endings from the previous game are considered canonical events, and most characters' motivations from that game remain unresolved. However, a small number of characters experienced significant events related to the universal events of Soulcalibur III. Siegfried has died and been resurrected by the Soulcalibur sword. Sophitia's daughter Pyrrha has been kidnapped by Tira and malfested by Soul Edge, leaving Sophitia to fight for the side of evil in defense of her now-corrupted daughter. Tira is also suffering from a split personality disorder. Most characters are still driven by a desire to either obtain, destroy, or defend one or both of the legendary swords now wielded by Siegfried and Nightmare, with most facing Algol as the final boss of Story mode. All characters feature animated ending cutscenes.

== Release ==
The Premium Edition of Soulcalibur IV included a 48-page softcover art/comic book illustrated in full color, an XL 100% cotton T-shirt, and a tournament chart that allowed fans the opportunity to document battles among friends. The reverse side of the chart served as a poster. It was packaged in a metal case and released on the same date as the regular edition, along with exclusive access to additional customization content for this version. This extra content included the automatic unlocking of the most powerful weapons and joke weapons for each character, as well as clothing items to create a schoolboy or schoolgirl character.

On January 11, 2008, it was announced that Ubisoft had signed an agreement with Namco Bandai Games to distribute the game and Soulcalibur Legends in PAL-region territories, including Europe and Australia. In these territories, a SteelBook case edition was released instead of the premium version, which included a bonus DVD containing four trailers in HD, four wallpapers, exclusive concept art, and an exclusive booklet with character biographies.

Shortly after the initial release, various pieces of paid downloadable content became available, including music tracks from the original Soulcalibur, customization equipment, and weapon packs. On October 23, 2008, the options to play as Yoda in the PS3 version of the game and Darth Vader in the Xbox 360 version became available via paid downloadable content. However, both pieces of DLC were later removed from PSN and XBL due to licensing issues following the purchase of Star Wars by Disney.

== Reception ==
Reception

Aggregate scores
Aggregator	Score
GameRankings	84.59%
Metacritic	85/100

Review scores
Publication	Score
1Up.com	A
Electronic Gaming Monthly	88.3%
GameRevolution	83%
GameSpot	8.5/10
GameSpy	4.5/5
IGN	8.7/10
PlayStation Official Magazine – UK	10/10
X-Play	4/5

Award
Publication	Award
Spike Video Game Awards	Fighting Game of the Year

Soulcalibur IV received mostly positive reviews from media outlets. In 2014, six years after its initial release, it held an average Metacritic score of 85 for both its PlayStation 3 and Xbox 360 versions. The game was praised for its polished graphics, deep Character Creation mode, and long-awaited online play capability. Reviewers noted that the gameplay was accessible for newcomers and beginners while still offering plenty of depth and technicality for veterans and experienced players, including an abundance of single-player challenges in Tower of Lost Souls mode. The music was also praised, and Gaming Revolution summarized the game as "some of the best weapons-based fighting action in town".

Certain criticisms were directed towards the guest characters from the Star Wars franchise, with several critics maintaining that their presence felt unnatural and that Yoda and The Apprentice, in particular, were "broken" (a reference to a perceived imbalance in fighting games that gives some characters a vastly unfair advantage over others) and "absurd", respectively. Yoda's smaller size (and thus his immunity to grab attacks) was mentioned as one design issue. At the same time, Yoda's short range and low damage output were deemed problematic, making him both overpowered and underpowered simultaneously.

Soulcalibur IV topped the UK sales charts for several weeks on both the PS3 and Xbox 360. As of March 31, 2009, the game had sold 2.3 million copies worldwide.

=== Awards and accolades ===
- IGN Best of 2008: Best Xbox 360 Fighting Game
- Spike TV Video Game Awards: Best Fighting Game
- IGN's Top 20 Most Popular Xbox 360 Games of 2008: 17th
- Virgin Media's Top 20 Beat 'Em-Ups of All Time (2009): sixth

During the 12th Annual Interactive Achievement Awards, the Academy of Interactive Arts & Sciences nominated Soulcalibur IV for the "Fighting Game of the Year". In 2010, the game was included as one of the titles in the book 1001 Video Games You Must Play Before You Die.

== Sequel ==
Project Soul (the development team of the Soul series) had always suggested that Soulcalibur IV would be their final installment, as there were rumors that the team had disbanded. However, Katsuhiro Harada (producer of the Tekken series) indicated that he would seriously consider a sequel if there was sufficient interest. He informed fans that he was open to opinions and requests via Twitter, asking that messages be short and simple due to his limited English skills. While the possibility of a sequel appeared stronger than ever, Namco had not made any statements to confirm their commitment to the project. Fans were encouraged to continue showing support and interest to help secure the development of Soulcalibur V. On May 11, 2011, Namco Bandai officially announced the new game, which was released for the Xbox 360 and PlayStation 3 on January 31, 2012.

== See also ==
- Soulcalibur: Broken Destiny, a PSP version of the game
- Star Wars: Masters of Teräs Käsi
